Daniel Harrison Overmyer (December 6, 1924 – July 24, 2012) was an American businessman and warehouse mogul. During the height of his career, Overmyer was referred to as "the king of warehousing".

Overmyer founded and operated the D. H. Overmyer Warehouse Company, which included more than 350 warehouses and 32 million square feet of space in North America and Europe. In June 1964, Overmyer also established the D. H. Overmyer Communications Company to construct several ultrahigh frequency television stations. In July 1966, the Overmyer Network was announced to create a fourth television network competing with ABC, CBS and NBC. In March 1967, control of the Overmyer Network passed to new owners who changed the name to the United Network before broadcasting started on May 1, 1967. The network was unsuccessful and ceased operation after one month, with the last broadcast occurring on May 31.

Overmyer's acquisition and subsequent transfer of five TV station permits was the subject of a congressional investigation and hearings in 1968. The investigation resulted in significant changes in the rules and policies of the Federal Communications Commission regulating the sale of broadcast stations. Because of information from the congressional proceedings, the Federal Communications Commission held a hearing from 1970 to 1980 to investigate expense submissions affecting Overmyer's character qualification to remain a broadcast station licensee.

Early life and education
Overmyer was born in Ohio's then-third-largest city, Toledo. He was the only child of Harrison Morton "Harry" Overmyer  and his wife Cora Belle Overmyer (November 11, 1887 – December 14, 1963).

Overmyer's father, who was of German descent, owned and operated a chain of grocery stores in and around Toledo before he went into the warehousing business. His father founded the Merchants and Manufacturers Warehouse Co., which operated from Atlanta until the mid-20th century.

Overmyer, although born in Toledo, grew up in the nearby village of Ottawa Hills. He graduated from Ottawa Hills High School then attended and graduated from Denison University in Granville, Ohio. During his time at Denison in 1943, Overmyer was drafted into the army. He served as a private and a transport warrant officer during World War II. Overmyer helped with barge unloadings during the landings in Normandy on D-Day.

Career

Warehousing
In 1947, Overmyer opened his first warehouse in Toledo and later grew his warehouse chain to Akron and Canton, Ohio. Soon after that expansion, Overmyer founded the D. H. Overmyer Warehouse Company, further enlarging his company to include all of Ohio. During the 1960s, Overmyer's warehouse company quickly broadened across the United States, Canada, and Europe with 350 warehouses and 32 million square feet of space.

Television Broadcasting

WDHO-TV Toledo
In 1963, Overmyer turned his attention to television. On April 15, as an individual rather than under a corporate name, he applied to the Federal Communications Commission (FCC, Commission) for Toledo's first ultrahigh-frequency (UHF) television station on channel 79—the only commercial UHF channel allocated by the FCC to Toledo. Toledo had two commercial very high frequency (VHF) stations: CBS affiliate WTOL-TV and WSPD-TV (now WTVG), an ABC affiliate; the stations shared NBC programming.

UHF television stations were a speculative investment partially due to the low percentage of UHF-equipped TV sets: in 1963, only 7.3 percent of TV households could receive UHF broadcasts. However, the All-Channel Receiver Act, signed into law by President John F. Kennedy on July 10, 1962, would gradually increase the proportion of UHF-capable TV receivers: all sets shipped in interstate commerce after April 30, 1964, would have to receive UHF and VHF television stations. The All-Channel Receiver Act was passed in response to the large-scale failure of UHF-TV broadcasting in the 1950s. This failure was blamed on poor planning and decisions made by the FCC when the UHF frequency band was made available for television broadcasting in 1952. After the passage of the new law requiring UHF capability for receivers, the FCC's policy encouraged the rapid expansion of UHF television stations.

Producers Incorporated (Producers) and Springfield Television Broadcasting Corporation (Springfield) also filed applications for channel 79. In February 1964, the FCC announced a comparative hearing would be necessary before awarding the construction permit. On March 2, 1964, Springfield petitioned the FCC to add the issue of Overmyer's financial qualifications to the hearing. Springfield claimed the bank loans Overmyer intended to use were not firm commitments, and the warehouse company had insufficient funds to make loans to construct and operate the TV station. On April 29, 1964, the FCC denied the petition to add these considerations to the proceedings and said Overmyer had already satisfied the financial qualifications requirement. In 1968, during hearings held by the U.S. House of Representatives, these financial qualifications were examined in greater detail. In September 1964, Overmyer reached an agreement with Producers and Springfield to withdraw their applications in return for his payment of their out-of-pocket expenses.

On March 11, 1965, Overmyer was awarded the construction permit for channel 79. The requested call letters were WDHO-TV, based on Overmyer's initials. On August 6, 1965, Overmyer received approval from the FCC to change from channel 79 to 24. WDHO-TV began operation on May 3, 1966, as an independent station with no network affiliation. On April 28, 1966, before WDHO-TV began operation, Overmyer applied to the FCC to change its ownership from himself as an individual to D. H. Overmyer Telecasting Company. WDHO-TV lost $1.3 million during its first two years of operation.

Overmyer Communications Company
In June 1964, Robert F. Adams, the executive vice president, announced the formation of the D. H. Overmyer Communications Company (Overmyer Communications Company). The company was solely owned by Overmyer and headquartered in New York City. The company began to acquire the full complement of TV properties allowed by FCC rules. The FCC limited ownership to seven TV stations—no more than five VHF.

Overmyer Communications Company purchased—from existing owners pending the FCC's approval of the transfers—the construction permits of three nonoperational UHF-TV stations: August 17, 1964, dark-station WATL-TV channel 36 in Atlanta (operated 1954–55 as WQXI-TV); September 2, 1964, WNOP-TV channel 74 in Newport, Kentucky (in the Cincinnati area); and on November 16, 1964, KBAY-TV channel 20 in San Francisco. WNOP-TV and KBAY-TV had never been constructed. The Overmyer Communications Company also applied to the FCC requesting construction permits for new UHF stations in three markets: October 21, 1964, channel 55 in Stamford, Connecticut; November 10, 1964, channel 29 in Dallas; and February 12, 1965, channel 17 in Rosenberg, Texas (in the Houston area). Overmyer also requested a waiver from the FCC's rule limiting ownership to seven stations. If approved, the eighth would be the transfer of the construction permit for UHF dark-station WAND-TV, which operated during 1953–54 as WKJF-TV channel 53 in Pittsburgh (construction permit transfer application submitted February 12, 1965). After the FCC denied his waiver request, Overmyer withdrew the application for the Stamford station on May 11, 1965, and the WAND-TV transfer application was resubmitted on May 18, 1965.

In 1965, the FCC approved several construction permit transfer applications and one new construction permit for Overmyer Communications Corporation: WNOP-TV in Cincinnati on March 10, WATL-TV in Atlanta on May 12, WAND-TV in Pittsburgh on July 28, Houston on August 12 , and KBAY-TV in San Francisco on October 20 (Overmyer held 80 percent). The FCC adopted a new UHF allocation table on June 4, 1965 that moved the Rosenberg, TX channel from 17 to 58, so Overmyer's application was approved for the new channel. Overmyer's ownership interest in KBAY-TV differed from the other stations because the owner Sherrill C. Corwin—chairman and owner of Los Angeles-based Metropolitan Theatres Corporation—retained 20 percent of the stock in the station. Overmyer held an option to purchase Corwin's stock interest between the forty-ninth and sixty-third months after the station started operation.

Overmyer's Dallas application was contested by two other applicants, Grandview Broadcasting Company and Maxwell Electronics Corporation. The FCC scheduled a comparative hearing for March 14, 1966, for the Dallas construction permit applicants. Grandview Broadcasting withdrew its application leaving Overmyer and Maxwell Electronics as the remaining competitors for the construction permit. In December 1966, the FCC agreed to delete channel 29 and open channels 33 and 27 to allow both remaining applicants an opportunity to receive construction permits. Maxwell Electronics was awarded channel 33, and on October 1, 1967, KMEC-TV began operation. Overmyer switched his application to channel 27 but had to accept the possibility of competing applications. On March 14, 1967, the FCC announced that the McLendon Corporation, partially owned by Gordon McLendon, had filed an application in competition with Overmyer for channel 27 in Dallas. McLendon Corporation held KLIF-AM and KNUS-FM in Dallas, along with several other radio stations and nonbroadcast companies. After subsequent financial difficulties, Overmyer withdrew his application for the Dallas station, which the FCC deleted on October 17, 1967. On December 13, 1967, the FCC awarded McLendon the channel 27 construction permit.

The stations were incorporated separately as subsidiaries under the Overmyer Communications Company, but D. H. Overmyer Telecasting Company separately owned WDHO-TV:

D. H. Overmyer Broadcasting Co., Inc., a Texas corporation (KJDO-TV, Houston)

D. H. Overmyer Communications Co., Inc., a Georgia corporation (WBMO-TV, Atlanta)

D. H. Overmyer Broadcasting Co., Inc., an Ohio corporation (WSCO-TV, Cincinnati)

D. H. Overmyer Communications Co., Inc., a Pennsylvania corporation (WECO-TV, Pittsburgh)

D. H. Overmyer Communications Co., Inc., a California corporation (KEMO-TV, San Francisco)

The call letters chosen for the stations were the initials of Overmyer's family members. The company began large-scale equipment purchases for the TV stations in the fall of 1965. In 1966, a $3 million order was placed to purchase station programming.  Sites had been established for most of the stations by late 1966. Construction of the stations in Atlanta and Pittsburgh had been delayed due to difficulty finding suitable sites for the tall towers needed for the antennas. Overmyer applied to the FCC, requesting a change to the Cincinnati table of allocations moving channel 74 to 19. On February 9, 1966, the FCC adopted the Fifth Report and Memorandum Opinion and Order, changing the allocation of many UHF channel assignments, including granting Ovemyer's request. Overmyer's application to the FCC to have the Rosenberg, TX channel changed from 58 to 45 was granted on November 2, 1966. A report made in January 1967 documented the current state of construction for the TV stations:

KEMO-TV Channel 20, San Francisco

The transmitter site lease on San Bruno Mountain was complete.
The transmitter building construction had been completed.
The transmitter installation was in progress.
The antenna was under construction, with delivery expected in April 1967.
The tower had been delivered but not erected.
The studio building at 2500 Marin St. San Francisco was leased and about to undergo remodeling.

WSCO-TV Channel 19, Cincinnati

The transmitter site on Bald Knob in Cincinnati had been purchased.
The transmitter building construction had been completed.
The transmitter had been delivered but not installed.
The antenna had been constructed but had not been delivered. It would be installed in June 1968.
The tower was constructed but not delivered; it would be erected in April 1967. 
The studio location at 1150 W. Eighth St. Cincinnati was chosen, but no lease had been signed.
No studio remodeling had started.
Studio equipment had been delivered and was in storage.

WECO-TV Channel 53, Pittsburgh

The site for the transmitter and studio using the original WENS-TV channel 16 building on Ivory Avenue in Pittsburgh had been selected.
Negotiations to purchase site and building were underway.
Some equipment had been delivered.
No construction had started.

WBMO-TV Channel 36, Atlanta

The site for the transmitter at Briarcliff Road and Shepherds Lane in Atlanta had been selected but not yet leased from the Shepherd Construction Company.
The site for the studio (former Shepherd family home) at 1810 Briarcliff Road in Atlanta was under negotiation but no lease was signed.
Some equipment had been delivered.
No construction had started.

KJDO-TV Channel 45, Houston

No final studio or transmitter sites were chosen; a tower location land purchase from Texaco Corp. was in discussion.
No equipment had been delivered.
No construction had been started.
WDHO-TV in Toledo had been the only station to go into operation.

In the summer of 1966, Overmyer discovered that the company managing the construction of his warehouses was in financial difficulty. Payments to the subcontractors had stopped, which resulted in liens being placed on the unfinished warehouse properties in October 1966. All warehouse construction ended, and no funding sources were found to finance the expansion of the warehouse company. Without legal obligation, D. H. Overmyer Company Inc. (Ohio) guaranteed the $6 million debt assumed by its warehouse subsidiaries from the Green & White Construction Company. Guaranteeing the debt removed the liens on the buildings, and warehouse construction was resumed. However, the increased debt restricted the funds needed to finance further growth of the warehouse company and the TV stations. The original plan was for the warehouse company profits to aid in financing the construction of the TV stations and their early operational deficits. By assuming the Green & White debt, Overmyer was forced to redirect the warehouse profits into paying off that obligation over several years. The Overmyer Company began a search for a partner for the warehousing and communications companies.

Sale of controlling interest in construction permits to A.V.C. Corporation
Overmyer sought the services of the Philadelphia investment firm Butcher and Sherrerd to find a partner or investor for the warehousing company. Joseph L. Castle, an employee and later partner in Butcher and Sherrerd, thought that the television construction permits afforded the best opportunity to raise funds. Castle was also a stockholder in the Philadelphia UHF station WPHL-TV. He thought that combining WPHL-TV and the Overmyer permits into a new company could take advantage of economies of scale and build on the experience of WPHL-TV.

Castle arranged for A.V.C. Corporation (AVC) and Overmyer to begin discussions looking toward a sale of the permits. In 1963, the American Viscose Corporation (Avisco), a manufacturer of industrial fibers, sold its manufacturing operations to FMC Corporation. The investments owned by the American Viscose Corporation were not included in the sale, and the company name was changed to A.V.C. Corporation; it was a publicly-traded investment company with its stock listed on the  American Stock Exchange and headquartered in Wilmington, Delaware. The manufacturing operations of American Viscose continued under its name and became a division of the FMC Corporation.

In March 1967, Overmyer negotiated with AVC to sell an interest in five of his construction permits. None of the stations involved in the sale had been placed in operation.  Overmyer agreed to sell 80 percent of the stock in each of his subsidiary corporations that held the construction permits for Atlanta (WBMO-TV), Cincinnati (WSCO-TV), San Francisco (KEMO-TV), Pittsburgh (WECO-TV), and Houston (KJDO-TV). AVC desired to purchase total ownership of the construction permits but was turned down by Overmyer during the sale negotiations. The consideration for Overmyer's stock was 80 percent of his out-of-pocket expenses used to obtain and develop the permits, which the FCC must approve—but not to exceed $1 million. Overmyer insisted on a $3 million loan as a condition for the stock sale to AVC; in response, AVC included an option in the contract to acquire the remaining 20 percent stock in the stations and received the assignment of Overmyer's option to purchase Corwin's 20 percent stock in KEMO-TV.

On March 28, 1967, AVC and Overmyer signed the contracts for the Stock Purchase and Loan Agreements to transfer control—if the FCC approved—of the Overmyer subsidiary corporations to AVC. AVC paid a $1 million down payment to Overmyer pending FCC approval of the transfer of control. On May 1, 1967, Howard Butcher III, a partner in Butcher and Sherrerd, joined the board of directors of AVC Corporation. On May 3, 1967, AVC made the first $1.5 million of the $3 million loan to Overmyer; the last half of the loan would be made at the closing of the sale for the permits.

After signing the sale agreement with Overmyer, AVC formed a wholly-owned subsidiary, the U.S. Communications Corporation (USCC, U.S. Co.), headquartered in Philadelphia (incorporated in Wilmington, Delaware). On June 6, 1967, AVC assigned to U.S. Communications Corporation all of the contractual rights and options negotiated with Overmyer in the March 28, 1967 agreement. On June 8, 1967, AVC arranged a merger of Philadelphia Television Broadcasting Company (owners of WPHL-TV) into U.S. Communications Corporation, which—with later FCC approval—would result in a transfer of control of six stations in the top fifty markets to a single owner. The American Research Bureau (ARB) TV market rankings in 1967 using net weekly circulation for the six cities were as follows: Philadelphia, 4; San Francisco, 7; Pittsburgh, 9; Cincinnati, 16; Atlanta, 19; and Houston, 25. Butcher and Sherrerd would receive 7937 shares of stock in U.S. Communications Corporation—1.5 percent of the company—as payment for their services in arranging the merger and acquisition. Castle would exchange his interest in WPHL-TV for 2000 shares of U.S. Communications Corporation stock (0.37 percent of the company). If the FCC allowed the sale, U.S. Communications would control the five former Overmyer subsidiaries and own all of the stock in a newly formed subsidiary corporation (PTBC Inc.) that would hold WPHL-TV.

On June 30, 1967, the FCC received Overmyer's applications to sell 80 percent of the stock in each of his five subsidiary corporations that were the permittees of the construction permits. A majority of the FCC commissioners voted to approve both the Overmyer and WPHL-TV transfers to U.S. Communications Corporation on December 8, 1967. WDHO-TV in Toledo was not involved in the sale and remained wholly owned by D. H. Overmyer Telecasting Company Inc. The names of the Overmyer permittee corporations where control was transferred were subsequently changed to reflect the majority ownership by U.S. Communications Corporation.

The consent of the commissioners to the transfers was controversial because of waiving their interim policy and proposed rule concerning Multiple Ownership of Television Broadcast Stations (Docket No. 16068 FCC 65-547 and 65-548)—the so-called Top Fifty Interim Policy—which was adopted on June 21, 1965. In addition, the transfer of control of the construction permits from Overmyer to U.S. Communications was questionable because the sale price and option agreement might violate FCC policy. The Top Fifty Interim Policy was applied while undergoing public comment before possible adoption as a rule. The proposed rule change resulted in intense opposition from the broadcast industry. It restricted ownership to seven TV stations (not more than five VHF), with only three (no more than two VHF) allowed in the top fifty markets. It was adopted to promote diversity of ownership and competition in the largest media markets. The proposed rule would not have required existing group owners to divest holdings that exceeded the new limits. The Top Fifty Interim Policy required a hearing if the application would result in ownership exceeding the policy's limits; however, a waiver of the hearing requirement was possible if the applicant demonstrated that an exemption from the policy served the public interest. The FCC's stated standard of a sufficient presentation was a "compelling affirmative showing that the grant of the application was justified". The FCC had awarded Overmyer's permits in 1965 under the previous rule that limited the applicant to seven TV stations (not more than five VHF) with no restriction on market ranking. Since the adoption of the Top Fifty Interim Policy, a majority of the FCC commissioners had voted to grant a waiver of the hearing requirement and approve the transfers in all eight prior cases where it had arisen in transfer proceedings.

The FCC's approval for the transfer of twice the number of construction permits allowed by the Top Fifty Interim Policy was addressed by FCC Commissioner Kenneth A. Cox (D-WA) in his dissenting statement: 

The FCC had a long-standing policy limiting compensation in the sale of construction permits—as opposed to operational TV stations—to out-of-pocket expenses made in obtaining the permit and those related to the station's construction:

The out-of-pocket expense policy was adopted to prevent the acquisition and subsequent sale of construction permits as a profit-making device. The FCC wanted to prevent obtaining permits under false pretenses, purely for profit, without providing the promised broadcast service to the public. In the Overmyer construction permit transfers to U.S. Communications, the FCC approved an expense claim of $1,331,900.00, so—because of the ceiling price limit of the contract—the final payment for the 80 percent stock was $1 million, which had been previously paid at the signing of the contracts. Half of the expenses were submitted using documented evidence proving they were incurred in furthering the permits. The other half lacked this documentation and was based instead on an unusual approximation method the FCC had never encountered.
The undocumented portion of the expenses involved services provided for the five permittees by Overmyer companies besides the communications company. Although these expenses occurred from July 1964 through March 1967, the construction permit transfer application filed with the FCC stated that usable records were only available from a base period of September–December 1966.The Overmyer Company Inc. managers created a formula to approximate the undocumented portion of the out-of-pocket expenses using the available records from the base period:

1. An estimate for each employee's time spent on communications company activity during the base period was divided by the total time worked—by that same employee—during the same period. The result was a percentage of that employee's time expended for the communications company.

2. The percentage from step 1—unique for each employee—was multiplied by the employee's salary paid during the base period.

3. This portion of each employee's salary from step 2 was added to those (calculated in the same way) of all employees in their particular department.

4. The sum found in step 3 was divided by the total salaries paid to all employees in that department during the base period in order to form a percentage applicable to communications services performed by the entire department.

5. The percentage found in step 4—unique for each department—was multiplied by the total expenses of that department accrued during the base period.

6. The expenses found in step 5—for all departments—were added to form the total expenses attributable to the communications company's activities—that were performed by the other Overmyer companies—during the base period.

The total base period expenses found in step 6 were used to approximate the entire undocumented portion of the out-of-pocket costs.  The estimated activity levels of communications efforts during several intervals outside the base period were compared to those within the base period. These resulting activity percentages were used to apply several modified base period expenses to intervals outside the base period—where no usable records were available. This process estimated the expenses of Overmyer's other companies for services they provided for the communications company from July 1964 through March 1967. A deduction was made to account for communications activities unrelated to the transferred permits. The result was the reimbursable portion of the undocumented out-of-pocket expenses. The FCC's acceptance of this unusual method despite the lack of evidence supporting half of Overmyer's expenses illustrated weaknesses in the out-of-pocket expense policy. In his dissenting statement, Cox commented on the expenses submitted in the application:

Cox's comment on the unlikelihood of AVC acquiring a block of construction permits (or operational stations) outside of this transfer illustrated an unusual effect of the law regulating station trading in the Communications Act of 1934. In transfers of construction permits and operational stations, the seller chooses a buyer, and the FCC is forbidden from considering other possible buyers as being more desirable from the aspect of public interest. Essentially, the FCC only approves or denies that particular transaction. In later congressional testimony Cox stated that

 

By contrast, when granting new construction permits, the FCC prefers applicants with local ownership and management. If multiple applicants exist for a TV channel allocation, the FCC must hold a comparative hearing where the applicants compete on several criteria. The FCC can then select the best applicant to serve the public interest. AVC had no local connection in any markets involved in the Overmyer construction permit transfers. Without this block transfer from an existing permittee and assuming channel allocations were available in these markets, AVC would probably encounter comparative hearings with multiple local applicants when applying for these five construction permits. After considerable expense and delay, they might not be granted any construction permits, and obtaining a total of six in the fifty largest markets would be inconceivable. The restriction of not examining alternative applicants in station and construction permit transfers created many situations where a transfer was approved to a party who probably would not have prevailed in a comparative hearing.

The sale included a $3 million loan to several warehouse subsidiaries of D. H. Overmyer Company Inc. (Ohio) and an option for U.S. Communications to purchase the remaining 20 percent of the TV stations at a price up to but not exceeding $3 million. If the option agreement were exercised, the contract called for the purchase price to apply against the $3 million loan principal owed by Overmyer. Cox's dissenting statement asserted that if U.S. Communications exercised the option, the intention was that Overmyer would not have to repay the loan, which would make the $3 million loan part of the purchase price:

In later congressional testimony, Cox criticized the out-of-pocket expense submission and the loan and option agreement as affording a profit in violation of FCC policy. He indicated a hearing should have been held to examine these matters more closely.

FCC Commissioner Robert T. Bartley (D-TX) issued a dissenting statement concurring with the views expressed by Commissioner Cox:

FCC Commissioner Nicholas Johnson (D-IA), voting against the transfer, stated, "I strongly regret the majority's faithlessness to Commission policy and its
cynical refusal to attempt even a token effort at defending its result with reasons. I join the articulate and thoughtful opinions of my colleagues Commissioners
Cox and Bartley."

FCC Commissioner Lee Loevinger (D-MN) wrote the only statement in support of the Overmyer construction permit transfers:

Three of the four FCC commissioners who voted to approve the construction permit transfers did not write supporting statements: James Wadsworth (R-NY), Robert Lee (R-IL), and Rosel Hyde (R-ID), chairman of the FCC.

Congressional Hearings

Congressional Hearing of December 15, 1967
To regulate broadcast services in 1967, the FCC had seven commissioners—the Commission—appointed by the president and assisted by the Broadcast Bureau (Bureau); the Bureau was responsible for investigating applications and making recommendations to the commissioners who vote on final decisions. The Commission had cast a four-to-three vote to approve the sale of majority control of five of Overmyer's subsidiary corporations holding construction permits to U.S. Communications Corporation. The written statements of the FCC commissioners formed much of the basis of a subsequent congressional investigation.

Rep. Harley O. Staggers (D-WV), chairman of the Special Subcommittee on Investigations of the Committee on Interstate and Foreign Commerce House of Representatives (Subcommittee), called the commissioners to a hearing regarding their consent to the transfer. The initial hearing with the commissioners—all were present except Wadsworth—covered the concerns expressed by the minority in their dissenting  statements regarding the waiver of the Top Fifty Interim Policy and the profit potential for Overmyer in violation of FCC policy. At the December 15, 1967 meeting, Staggers said the hearings would continue in the next congressional session, where the principals involved in transferring the construction permits would be asked to testify.  
Hyde reminded the Subcommittee that the FCC had a priority to assist the development of UHF:

In a dissenting statement submitted during a previous case similar to Overmyer, Cox cautioned the commissioners regarding their repeated accommodation in the interest of UHF: "I favor expanded UHF service like my colleagues, but I think we sometimes fall into the error of allowing almost anything in the name of UHF. We should not be emotionally predisposed to accept every argument which seeks to use UHF's cause for short range private benefit."

In the Overmyer transfer case, the FCC’s desire to encourage rapid UHF television development conflicted with its Top Fifty Interim Policy on the concentration of ownership and the need to investigate this transaction further.

Several Subcommittee members questioned Hyde regarding the decision of the majority not to hold hearings despite indications that a more extensive investigation into the transfer of the construction permits was warranted. Hyde testified that—in his opinion—if a hearing were ordered, the transfer would have been abandoned 

The following exchange between Staggers and Hyde indicated the primary reason an FCC hearing was not ordered:
The Chairman. I should think in a transfer of this magnitude it
would have been wise at least to have held a hearing.
Mr. Hyde. Chairman Staggers, I believe that the possibility of
refinancing the UHF stations would have failed had we designated
the matter for hearing.

A question from Subcommittee member Rep. J. J. Pickle (D-TX) revealed that an FCC hearing could create significant delays in getting the TV stations in operation:
Mr. Pickle. Would full hearings have caused unusual delays?
Mr. Hyde. I think so. I believe it might very well have defeated
this effort to salvage a sinking enterprise.

A question from Subcommittee member Rep. Paul Rogers (D-FL), suggested an FCC hearing was needed to investigate Overmyer's efforts to finance the TV stations:
Mr. Rogers. By a public hearing you could have questioned Overmyer
and found out if he had tried to raise cash, how much assets
he needed. He must have had considerable assets to get a $3 million
loan.
Mr. Hyde. I believe to have ordered a hearing in this case would
have been the finish of the whole project.

Hyde explained why holding a hearing would jeopardize the transfer proceeding:

In his dissenting opinion, Cox addressed the possibility of delays associated with hearings and how Overmyer's approach to the transfers was the primary reason a hearing was required:

Subcommittee member Rep. John Dingell (D-MI) questioned Hyde for more specific reasons why a hearing was not held:
Mr. Dingell. What consideration went into the consideration of
the matter that no hearing was required in this matter?
Mr. Hyde. One, we felt we did have full information.
Two, it is a matter where in the nature of things expeditious action
is required if the Commission is, in fact, going to act.
Mr. Dingell. What is in the record to show expedition was
required?
Mr. Hyde. The financial distress of the permittee.
Mr. Dingell. You are required under the FCC Act to make a finding
in the public interest?
Mr. Hyde. Yes.
Mr. Dingell. Where is there the requirement that you come to the
conclusion that the permittee is under financial stress? There is no
place in the act where this is required, is there?
Mr. Hyde. No.
Mr. Dingell. Public interest is the sole test.
Mr. Hyde. That is right, but I am suggesting to you that the plight
of a station and the effect of the distress of the operator upon the
public service is a relevant consideration.

The Stock Purchase Agreement between Overmyer and AVC included a provision allowing either party to terminate the agreement if the FCC did not approve the sale of the construction permits within six months of filing the transfer applications. The delay would have been substantially beyond six months and perhaps years if the FCC ordered a hearing.

In a later exchange, Dingell pressed Hyde on the lack of investigation by the FCC regarding the Overmyer permit transfers to U.S. Communications:
Mr. Dingell. Here you have something that contravenes the 3-year
rule, the rule with regard to concentration of ownership in the 50 top
markets, and these are only the top 25. You have also allowed the
evolution of a rather interesting financial arrangement on which
there is broad controversy as to whether or not it is a $4 million
compensation or not.
You had no scrutiny in the form of an objective hearing to find
out the real circumstances. You concede you have engaged in no independent
scrutiny of the truth or falsity of the papers submitted to the
Commission.
You further say the way you will police this is by waiting to see
whether or not these statements were true or false with the later hope
that perhaps you will consider these in some relicensing
proceeding that will take place in the vague future.
Mr. Hyde. I don't want to give the impression that I have any
doubts about the validity of the showings before us or that I feel it
is necessary for us to police it to make sure that the representations
they made were true.
I am saying that should they, unknown to us, have made misrepresentations,
there are sanctions adequate to deal with it.
Mr. Dingell. Don't you think you have a responsibility as Chairman
of that Commission to ascertain the truth or falsity of statements
where there are questions of the kind we see here and where the rules
of the Commission regarding hearings are being so broadly and
wantonly waived by the Commission?
Mr. Hyde. I think we have a responsibility to see that the documents
on which we act are truthful.
I also think we are not required to go out and investigate to see
whether there are—go out on a witch hunt
Mr. Dingell. I am asking whether you made an independent investigation.
You said you have not?
Mr. Hyde. There is no evidence of irregularity that would warrant
a special investigation.
Mr. Dingell. How do you know there is no evidence of irregularity
You conducted no hearing and made no independent scrutiny?
Mr. Hyde. This is the way we must act. We do not undertake field
investigations of every application filed with us. We could not do our
business with the resources we have if we had to proceed in that way.
Mr. Dingell. But you have an extraordinary situation. Commission
rules say you will have a hearing in circumstances where the
license is under 3 years old when transferred, and you will have a
hearing where there is a tendency toward concentration because of
the excessive number of licensees operating in five or whatever the
number is of the top 50. Here you have five of the top 25. You made
no independent investigation and had no hearing.
Mr. Hyde. There is no tendency to monopoly or concentration here
in the transfer of five UHF stations in markets where they will be
competing with the strongest forces in the broadcasting industry.

Hyde concluded that Overmyer's application was sufficient for the Commission's approval of the transfers without additional investigation: "We have examined the whole matter carefully to assure ourselves that we have full information. If we felt we did not have it we would either undertake further inquiries or have a hearing."

The 3-year rule, erroneously cited by Dingell as applicable in this case, required TV stations to be held for three consecutive years before selling to a new owner. The FCC adopted this rule (Rule 1.365, which was subsequently moved to 1.597) on March 15, 1962,  to discourage trafficking in permits of operational stations. The rule was intended to stop the high turnover rate in ownership of stations used to produce quick profits rather than providing long-term continuity of service necessary to serve the public interest. It did not apply to the transfer of construction permits, so it was irrelevant in the Overmyer investigation. The FCC's out-of-pocket expense policy was intended to limit trafficking in construction permits.

Dingell questioned Cox regarding the need for examining Overmyer's out-of-pocket expense submissions in a hearing:
Mr. Dingell. I would like to direct the first question to Commissioner
Cox who discussed rather eloquently a statement on page 2, referring
to permits being held to actual expenses.
The statement goes on to say "Certainly it represents a novel approach
which I think would have to be tested in a hearing before it
could be accepted."
Then he goes on to make further statements and makes a further
comment with regard to the nature of these expenditures and how they
conform to previous Commission practices.
Mr. Cox. I don't believe we have ever had this method of justifying
expenses used before. That does not mean it may not be valid, but I
feel before it is accepted in such a significant amount it would have
been desirable to test it in a hearing.
As I understand the procedure, they took a part of the period during
which Overmyer was acquiring and holding these permits for which
they had some records as to the services provided by other parts of his
empire. They then applied a certain percentage factor to these for
other parts of the period, for which records were not available. This is
all supported by affidavits of individuals in the Overmyer enterprises
as to what part of their time they devoted to broadcast aspects of his
operation.
To simply accept the aggregate of these figures without detailed testing
seems to me to be unsound. That is why I suggested a hearing
would have been appropriate.

In a further exchange with Rogers, Hyde revealed his opinion of why Overmyer retained 20 percent of the stations rather than selling for the entire out-of-pocket expenses. Hyde's answer essentially agreed with Cox's dissenting statement regarding the true nature of the Stock Purchase and Loan Agreements:
Mr. Rogers. He did not have a competitive agreement. Why did he
have to get into the other properties? If this was to be a clean deal,
if the sales price was only for out-of-pocket expenses, why did he not
just mortgage the other 20 percent for the remaining $300,000 of
out-of-pocket expense?
Mr. Hyde. I do not know, but it would appear that Mr. Overmyer
had found a source of capital to also rescue some other operations.

In a subsequent exchange with Hyde, Rogers indicated that the FCC had made it possible for Overmyer to recover more than the stated out-of-pocket expenses using the loan and stock option arrangement with AVC:
Mr. Rogers. Is it true that under the agreement that you approved it
is stated it is understood the price to be paid for the stock shall not in
any event exceed $3 million?
Mr. Hyde. Yes.
Mr. Rogers. The price for the stock. Now the stock is the 20 percent
of the permit that the out-of-pocket expense amounts to about $300,000
on?
Why didn't the Commission restrict that price of the 20 percent
stock to $300,000? You restricted the first 80 percent to $1 million.
If you really are carrying out the intent to hold these transfer
permits to out-of-pocket expense you should have restricted the 20
percent to what the out-of-pocket expenses were.
Otherwise any one can come in, make a mortgage agreement, and
get whatever money they want.
You say "Well, it is later on."
Mr. Hyde. AVC Corp. has not contracted to pay $3 million for it.
They have an option to pay
Mr. Rogers. They didn't contract to pay out-of-pocket expenses for
it, either. You have not seen to that.
Mr. Hyde. I think we have.
Mr. Rogers. Show me the language.
Mr. Hyde. We have required a submission of their costs so that we
could make a determination as to whether or not an amount
Mr. Rogers. In their own agreement it says they can pay up to $3
million for that 20 percent but no more.
Mr. Hyde. They can.
Mr. Rogers. I thank the gentleman.

Rogers continued to press Hyde that Overmyer's 20 percent retained stock, combined with the option for U.S. Communications to purchase at a later time, was a device to circumvent the Commission's out-of-pocket expense policy:
Mr. Rogers. So you would have allowed only out of pocket?
Mr. Hyde. Yes.
Mr. Rogers. As I understand it from the agreement, when that
permit was to change hands, they said, "We will pay you for only
80 percent of it right now"?
Mr. Hyde. Right, sir.
Mr. Rogers. "I am giving you $1 million for this."
Mr. Hyde. Yes.
Mr. Rogers. "But this 20 percent I will pay you $3 million for under
the agreement."
Mr. Hyde. The buyer has an option to pay $3 million for it—up to
that or less—which he is not obliged to exercise.
Mr. Rogers. I agree he does not have to.
Why did you not, in your investigation, require that to be restricted
for the 20 percent of the stock, restricted to the actual out-of-pocket
expenses prorated.
Mr. Hyde. I don't think it would have been appropriate or necessary
for this reason:
Overmyer does not get his full out-of-pocket expenses. There are 
$332,000 left uncompensated.
If he wants to risk that for 4 years as an investment, a venture in
UHF, why should he not be permitted to do it?
Mr. Rogers. Why should not everybody do the same thing any time
they want to buy a permit, sell a 60-, 70-, or an 80-percent interest,
which controls the permit, and simply say after 3 years you can buy the
rest, up to $3 million, $4 million, $5 million? Does this really not get
around your policy of trying to hold it to out-of-pocket expense?
Mr. Hyde. I don't believe the arrangements in this get outside our
policy.

Rogers questioned Hyde for the specific justification made that satisfied the "compelling affirmative showing" standard required for a waiver of the Top Fifty Interim Policy:
Mr. Rogers. In any waiver, there must be an overwhelming showing,
I should think, that it should be waived in order to show an
overriding public interest.
Mr. Hyde. Yes, sir. We believe that such a showing was made for
the purpose of this transfer.
I did want to mention to you that when Overmyer got his original
permit, there was no such policy. What has happened to Overmyer
is that he has found himself subjected to a procedural policy adopted
after he made his acquisition.
Mr. Rogers. This often happens. He has protected himself. But
this does not mean someone else can come in and violate the policy;
does it?
Mr. Hyde. It does not mean someone else can come in unless it can
be shown in a compelling way that the public interest would warrant
a waiver of that policy.
Mr. Rogers. I do not see the showing in the record.
Mr. Hyde. The basis on which the majority finds such a showing
is that you have the UHF stations in five more markets unable to
go ahead with the capital available, and another source of capital
available which will assure their operation.

Congress and the FCC had been concerned about trafficking in broadcast station permits and licenses for many years. Trafficking occurs when construction permits or operational stations are acquired and traded primarily for profit rather than providing service to the public as required by the Communications Act of 1934. That possibility existed in this case because Overmyer never placed the stations on the air and seemingly sold the permits at a profit to AVC.

The subsequent congressional investigation in 1968 was to determine if the FCC adequately fulfilled its responsibility to examine these transactions for trafficking before approving the transfer of the permits and determine if any changes in the Communications Act of 1934 were needed to prevent it in the future.

In February 1968, two members of the Subcommittee, Dingell and Rep. John E. Moss (D-CA), introduced House Bill H.R. 15266, addressing concerns expressed by the Subcommittee during the initial hearing regarding the Overmyer construction permit transfer to U.S. Communications. The legislation proposed changes to the sections of the Communications Act of 1934—the statutory basis for the FCC's regulatory authority over broadcasting—governing the transfer of FCC construction permits and licenses. Among the provisions were to require FCC hearings on transfers, limit sale prices of permits and stations to an FCC-determined fair market value, strengthen financial disclosure requirements for transferors, and make transfers open to any interested parties rather than being restricted, under then-current law, to one selected by the transferor. An additional provision of the proposed legislation, unlikely to survive a court challenge, removed all legal shields protecting confidential communications between principals of the transfers and their advisers. The Communications Act of 1934 required the FCC to make a finding for each individual construction permit transfer that it was in the public interest. Under the proposed legislation, the FCC would further be required to express in its decision the specific justification for each individual transfer, illustrating how it served the public interest requirement of the Communications Act of 1934.

On February 7, 1968, the FCC terminated the Top Fifty Interim Policy limiting TV station ownership in the largest TV markets. Although the proposed rule was dropped, the FCC retained the provision requiring  a public interest showing in transfers exceeding the limit of the Top Fifty Interim Policy: "[W]e will expect a compelling public interest showing by those seeking to acquire more than three stations (or more than two VHF stations) in those markets."

The Commission noted that the success of UHF television expansion was an essential reason for terminating the Top Fifty Interim Policy:

In his dissenting statement regarding the termination of the Top Fifty Interim Policy, Commissioner Johnson noted that this was another act of many intended for the benefit of UHF television:

Overmyer and U.S. Communications Corporation
On January 15, 1968, at Overmyer's New York City headquarters, the closing for the sale of majority control of the five construction permits to U.S. Communications Corporation was held. At the closing, Overmyer received the second $1.5 million portion of the total $3 million agreed to in the loan contract signed on March 28, 1967.

Because AVC was an investment company with no experience in television broadcasting, its relationship with U.S. Communications was generally limited to providing financing. An article in Broadcasting magazine on June 19, 1967, stated, "U.S. Communications will represent a merger of AVC capital and WPHL-TV know-how to get the five CP's [construction permits] on the air." Two of the former owner-managers of WPHL-TV, Leonard Stevens and Aaron Katz, were included in the management team of U.S. Communications Corporation. They brought their broadcasting experience to the station group as vice presidents and members of the board of directors. Castle became a partner in Butcher and Sherrerd and was appointed chairman of the board of directors of U.S. Communications Corporation. Frank H. Reichel Jr., president of AVC, was appointed president and treasurer of U.S. Communications Corporation and a member of the board of directors. Reichel also owned 6.33 percent of U.S. Communications Corporation's stock. After completing the transfers, AVC owned 70 percent of U.S. Communications Corporation, while the former owners of WPHL-TV, including Castle, Katz, Stevens and others, held 30 percent of the company.

Overmyer had no ownership interest—or management role as an officer or member of the board of directors—in AVC or U.S. Communications Corporation. His involvement was limited to holding 20 percent of the stock in each of four subsidiaries of U.S. Communications Corporation: U.S. Communications of Georgia, Inc. (WATL-TV in Atlanta); U.S. Communications of Pittsburgh, Inc. (WPGH-TV in Pittsburgh); U.S. Communications of Ohio, Inc.  (WXIX-TV in Cincinnati); and U.S. Communications of Texas, Inc. (KJDO-TV in Houston). Overmyer was not an officer of any of the U.S. Communications Corporation subsidiaries. He did not own any interest in WPHL-TV in Philadelphia or KEMO-TV in San Francisco. Twenty percent of the U.S. Communications of California, Inc. was held by Corwin—Overmyer's original partner in KEMO-TV. U.S. Communications Corporation had an option to buy Overmyer's remaining 20 percent interest in the stations and an assignment of his option to purchase Corwin's interest in KEMO-TV. The U.S. Communications Corporation could exercise the Overmyer option between January 16, 1971, and January 15, 1972. The interest payments on the $3 million loan were due until U.S. Communications exercised the option or the option period expired. If U.S. Communications did not pick up the option, the $3 million loan principal would be due. If the U.S. Communications Corporation did pick up the option, then the loan principal would be due, and the $3 million loan payoff amount would be reduced by a purchase price calculated using a formula. The sale price calculation was determined by using one of two methods as outlined in Overmyer's contract with AVC:

San Francisco 3%
Houston       5% 
Atlanta       5%
Cincinnati    8%
Pittsburgh    8% 

Overmyer could require U.S. Communications to make an immediate decision on whether or not to purchase his 20 percent stock interest during the option period. If U.S. Communications declined, the loan principal would be due. If U.S. Communications picked up the option, the purchase procedure described previously would be activated. The contract limited the highest purchase price to $3 million, which was also the amount loaned to Overmyer. The loan was secured by second mortgages on twenty-three of Overmyer's warehouse properties and his remaining 20 percent interest in the TV stations.  The U.S. Communications Corporation never executed its option to buy the 20 percent owned by Overmyer and Corwin in the stations. Overmyer did repay the $3 million loan in full.

Four of the five stations where majority control transferred from Overmyer to U.S. Communications Corporation signed on in 1968–69: KEMO-TV channel 20 in San Francisco (no Overmyer ownership interest) on April 1, 1968; WXIX-TV channel 19 in Cincinnati on August 1, 1968; WPGH-TV channel 53 in Pittsburgh on February 1, 1969; and WATL-TV channel 36 in Atlanta on August 16, 1969. The U.S. Communications group also included WPHL-TV channel 17 in Philadelphia (no Overmyer ownership interest), which began operation on September 17, 1965. The FCC deleted the construction permit of KJDO-TV channel 45 in Houston—which was never constructed—on October 13, 1971. Except for the studio location for WXIX-TV in Cincinnati, U.S. Communications used the studio and transmitter locations selected by Overmyer.

1968 Congressional Investigation and Hearings
The dissenting statements written by the FCC commissioners indicating that the FCC failed to protect the public interest in approving the transfers of the Overmyer permits to U.S. Communications attracted the attention of the U.S. House of Representatives, resulting in a congressional investigation in 1968. The hearings continued  on the Acquisition and Transfer of Five Overmyer Television Construction Permits. Sessions were held in Washington, D.C., on July 16, 17, 19, 31, and August 1, 1968. Overmyer, several associates, the FCC Broadcast Bureau's staff, and five of the seven commissioners, testified before the Special Subcommittee on Investigations. The Subcommittee took testimony from the commissioners on August 1, 1968. Commissioners Wadsworth and Loevinger were not present: Wadsworth was ill, and Loevinger had left the Commission at the expiration of his term on June 30, 1968.

The investigation was wide-ranging: it expanded beyond the initial concerns of the dissenting FCC commissioners by examining Overmyer's financial qualifications to obtain the original construction permits and irregularities regarding applications for additional time to construct the stations. The Subcommittee's investigators also looked into the Stock Purchase and Loan Agreements and the potential profit for Overmyer in violation of FCC policy. Overmyer's method of calculating out-of-pocket expenses was an essential issue in the hearings because half of the amount was based on opinion instead of hard-documented evidence. The Bureau's report acknowledged this approach was unusual but had not recommended the Commission hold a hearing to examine the method in detail. The Bureau judged that Overmyer's out-of-pocket expenses were acceptable under FCC policy and recommended the transfer's approval to the Commission in Bureau Memorandum 6738 (November 8 and 15, 1967). However, instead of an in-depth analysis, the primary justification was "the enthusiasm of Overmyer's commitment to entering UHF":

This memorandum to the Commission also stated, "In the Bureau's view the financial arrangements here are compatible with the public interest, and out-of-pocket expenses (which are subject to a question of proof) have been proven adequately." During the congressional hearings, the following testimony given by Edward Hautanen, an attorney with the   Bureau, responding to questions from Robert Lishman, chief counsel for the Special Subcommittee on Investigations, revealed no investigation was done by the Bureau on the out-of-pocket expenses claimed by Overmyer:
Mr. Lishman. Couldn't the Commission have made some kind of investigation as to whether or not these out-of-pocket expenses had actually been incurred?
Mr. Hautanen. I suppose such an investigation might have been made.
Mr. Lishman. Has the Commission made it in other cases?
Mr. Hautanen. Not that I am aware of, any case I have worked on.

In later questioning by Subcommittee member Rep. Hastings Keith (R-MA), Hautanen revealed that because of certification by the applicant and possible criminal penalties, the documents submitted to the FCC are generally accepted at face value with no further investigation:
Mr. Keith. How did you satisfy yourself that these were bona fide out-of-pocket expenses? What procedures did you use?
Mr. Hautanen. In this particular case, it was a rather lengthy document, let us say seven or eight pages, on which Mr. Overmyer substantiated his various out-of-pocket expenses. It was on the basis of this document which, as I say, was part of the certified applications, that we concluded
Mr. Keith. What kind of certification was on that application? 
Mr. Hautanen. The certification I refer to is the warning on the cover of the application which states that any false statements subject you to criminal punishment under section 1001 of title 18.
Mr. Keith. Does that include also omissions as well as errors of commission? 
Mr. Hautanen. Yes, sir. 
Mr. Keith. You have to take that at its face value because you have to have something to go on and these men do this under a certain penalty. 
Mr. Hautanen. That is the assumption. When they file an application, and so certify it as a responsible application, they will be held to it. 
Mr. Keith. You never seek to go back of that to check into the validity of that document? 
Mr. Hautanen. Generally speaking, no.
 

The documents Hautanen referred to were affidavits from managers of The Overmyer Company justifying the out-of-pocket expenses for their particular departments. The statements were filed with the FCC on June 30, 1967, in the certified applications to transfer control of the construction permits.

While under oath, Thomas J. Byrnes, executive vice president of The Overmyer Company, answered a question regarding the justification for using the out-of-pocket expense approximation formula and confirmed his previous assertion that no usable expense records existed outside of the four-month base period from September–December 1966:

Mr. Lishman. Can't we test fairness and propriety of this base
period allocation approach by pointing out various examples of the
real foolishness of it? For example, here is an employee, Albert E.
Owens. He is letter No. 17. He was employed only 1 month. He earned
$665. Now a total of $5,428 was charged to the communications companies
for the services of this employee which is $4,763 more than
his total earnings.
In the first place, I don't understand why you have to have a base
period at all. Out-of-pocket expenses are out-of-pocket expenses. When
you run it up on an estimated allocated basis of $666,000 and work out
some kind of formula that will take a peak period, I certainly don't see
any equity or justice.
Mr. Byrnes. It was the only period in which these allocated expenses
had been set out in such a way that they could be used, sir.
In response to a question from Keith regarding Overmyer's out-of-pocket expenses, Cox testified that the FCC should have held a hearing:
Mr. Keith. Under those circumstances, Commissioner Cox, you 
made what I thought was an extraordinarily well written justification for
the minority view. How did you go about getting your facts? How did
you resolve the questions that must have been in your mind and were
at variance with those of Mr. Hyde?
I have in mind particularly the out-of-pocket expense which seemed
to be extraordinarily poorly documented, and which would have alerted
me at once that this whole matter should be studied more closely.
I wondered how you went about satisfying yourself that your minority 
views were well founded.
Mr. Cox. I proceeded, Congressman Keith, basically on the 
document, the [Broadcast Bureau] staff report, that was before the Commission
and on the answers I got from questions to the [Broadcast Bureau] staff in 
the course of our deliberations. I did not have the opportunity to dig into the 
applications themselves. It seemed to me, on the face of the analysis 
that the [Broadcast Bureau] staff had made, that this was the first instance
in which we had had this kind of effort to establish out-of-pocket expenses.
Also, the method they outlined, as I understood it, seemed to be open
to serious question. The position I took was not that I had gone into the
files and really satisfied myself that the out-of-pocket expenses were
something else, but that it appeared to me that if this was really what
the applicant was doing, we clearly needed a hearing to explore this,
because it seemed to me it would probably require more than simply
the analysis and study of the application to find out what was the actual
basis for some of the estimates that went into the out-of-pocket calculations.

In later testimony, Cox said that the Bureau's staff could not adequately investigate Overmyer's out-of-pocket expenses outside of a hearing:

The Subcommittee also considered Overmyer's failure to include the required information in applications filed with the FCC for an extension of time to complete the construction of the stations.  Investigators indicated that the extension applications should have revealed—by Overmyer filing an amendment to them—the financial conditions preventing the completion of the stations and the intention to sell the construction permits. The extension applications were never amended to indicate the construction permits had been sold to AVC. The Subcommittee said that these omissions constituted a violation of FCC Rule 1.65, which was created to notify the Commission of all changes in the information needed to make decisions on the applications. Rule 1.65 specifically required the filing of amendments to applications notifying the Commission of pertinent changes. Investigators viewed this failure as a concealment of facts to keep the permits in salable condition. The Bureau considered the rule violation as only a technical infraction because although Overmyer had not submitted the transfer contracts by an amendment to the extension applications, he did file them with the ownership section of the FCC on April 28, 1967, within thirty days as required by Rule 1.65. However, the FCC was initially unaware the letter and contract were placed in their files, and their receipt was overlooked in supplying information to the Subcommittee. The FCC did not immediately grant the extensions for additional time to construct the stations upon receiving the applications; instead, according to standard practice, they were considered later at the same time as the applications for transfer of the construction permits to the U.S. Communications Corporation. Hyde stated, "I will agree that there ought to have been an appropriate reference in the [extension] applications to the filing of material in the ownership file. The fact it wasn't there does not mean that the Commission would not be on notice." Despite the Subcommittee's accusation that the applications for extension of time to complete construction were intentionally misleading to keep the permits active, the FCC was fully informed of Overmyer's financial difficulties and intention to sell control of the permittee corporations before approving the extension applications.

Hyde maintained that the Top Fifty Interim Policy was waived to ensure the five stations could quickly begin operation. He also cited the All-Channel Receiver Act as justification for the waiver because it prioritized UHF-TV development. Subcommittee member Rep. Brock Adams (D-WA) questioned George Smith, chief of the FCC's Broadcast Bureau, regarding the Top Fifty Interim Policy relative to UHF television development:Mr. Adams. What was your position on the top 50 market principle being set
aside for AVC and the fact that you would ordinarily not allow a nonlocal
corporation, with no previous broadcasting experience to stand
first in line for an application in the market?
Mr. George Smith. Mr. Chairman, ever since the Congress passed
the so-called all-channel receiver law, the Commission has continued to
follow a policy of doing everything it could to foster the development
of UHF television.

Subcommittee member Rep. Clarence J. Brown Jr. (R-OH) questioned Martin Levy, chief of FCC Broadcast Facilities, regarding expedition of construction permit transfers:

Mr. Brown. Is this what FCC is faced with on this particular problem of
construction permits granted to someone who then runs out of money
and can't put it on the air?
Mr. Levy. I think it is fair to say that the present Commission policy
is that once it has granted a construction permit and then before any
really substantial construction has been undertaken or money spent in
great amount, if that permittee decides to assign that permit to a third
party the Commission's policy has been to go ahead and permit the
assignment of the permit so long as the reimbursement does not exceed
the out-of-pocket expenses. That has been the general policy.
Mr. Brown. What is the Commission's rationale?
Mr. Levy. I think the Commission's rationale is that it is more likely
to get a station on the air sooner that way.
Mr. Brown. And this is desirable, getting the stations on the air is
desirable?
Mr. Levy. Yes, sir, particularly the UHF, the Commission has
thought this was desirable.

Hyde had testified in the Subcommittee hearing held on December 15, 1967, that imposing a hearing would have increased cost and caused a lengthy delay and would have likely resulted in withdrawal of the transfer application; comparative hearings might then be required to examine new applications, thereby creating long waits to start a new TV service. He also said a hearing was unnecessary because all of the information needed for the Commission to vote on the transfer was available. Hyde summarized his views on the hearing waiver:

Commissioner Lee testified regarding the likely effect of holding hearings for the construction permit transfers: "The alternative of setting up a hearing and delaying service to some 30 million people for 4 or 5 years was something I did not care to face."

Lishman pressed Hyde regarding the specific public interest determination that an urgent need for additional television service existed in all five markets that justified the waiver of so many FCC policies:
Mr. Lishman. One question. On what basis did the Commission determine
that each of the communities involved in the Overmyer transfer
had an unusual and urgent need for additional television service?
Mr. Hyde. I think that this decision was discussed in the overall. In
each instance it was a UHF station in an important market.
Commissioner Bartley reminds me that the Commission has made a
UHF station allocation to each one of these communities and there
would be, of course, an interest in seeing that made useful to the public.
As I indicated in the very first day of the hearings in this matter, we
had a situation where the grantee had found himself unable to proceed
and here was an opportunity to approve a transfer to new interests
who did have the substance to complete the construction and we thought
this indicated an urgent need.

The Broadcast Bureau found the loan agreement was acceptable based on collateral and interest charges at the prevailing rate. In its memorandum to the Commission recommending the approval of the transfer, the Bureau said the loan was partially justified by "his [Overmyer's] dedication to UHF and losses suffered in efforts to establish a fourth network":

Cox testified in the congressional hearing regarding his view of the loan and stock option:

Adams expressed his view of the loan and stock option contract: "It appears to me in it that you have, through the retention of the 20-percent interest and the basing of an option and repayment system on gross revenues rather than on any type of operation profit, an almost assurance of Mr. Overmyer receiving $1 million down and $3 million in a period of time on a half million investment, basically because we got a package of licenses."

During questioning by Adams, Cox commented that the FCC had been so accommodating to UHF that basic policies were not observed:

Mr. Adams. Commissioner Cox, is my characterization of the fact
that Overmyer in effect out of this picked up $4 million with every
expectation that he is going to net that out of it rather than being
a loan, is that characterization in part true?
Mr. Cox. We are predicting. My analysis, like yours, is that the
way the transaction is framed, this is the way it seems most likely to
me to work out. And certainly at a time when he apparently felt he
needed large sums of money, instead of simply getting back what he
had invested in these permits through an outright sale of them, he
got back 80 percent of what he claimed he had put into them plus a
loan of $3 million which I am morally certain AVC would not have
made to him if he had not been in a position to transfer the permits.
I don't think if he had been willing to sell all these permits to them
for $1,300,000 in one transaction and if he had gone back to AVC
the next week and said he would like to borrow $3 million on the
security of second mortgages on the warehouses, that they would
have been at all interested in that transaction. I think he was able to
get $4 million within a period of a relatively few months here, to
help him in the difficulties he had gotten into in his warehouse business
simply because he had the permits. Now I was anxious, as was the chairman
and the other members of the majority to see UHF succeed, to see the public
get more service, but I am not so anxious for that that I am willing to forgo
all our other policies. . . . It seems to me that the Commission
was so concerned about expediting UHF service that they did not maintain a proper
regard for these other two policies [Top Fifty Interim and out-of-pocket] which 
I feel are equally important.

In his dissenting opinion, Cox commented on the rigged nature of the option price formula:

On the last day of the congressional hearings, August 1, 1968, Keith questioned Hyde regarding Overmyer's use of the loan and option arrangement with AVC to evade the FCC out-of-pocket expenses policy and the Commission's justification for approving it:

Mr. Keith. It was really too much for me to comprehend how this
$3 million figure was arrived at. I was told yesterday by witnesses for
the AVC interests that they were willing to buy the stations for the
full out-of-pocket expenses a revelation which leads me to believe that
it must have been advantageous for Overmyer to take the 20-percent
figure and use it as collateral to get a settlement more favorable than
cash, itself.
There must be some value that could be assigned to that particular
20 percent, over and above what it represented in alleged out-of-pocket
expenses. Was the Commission aware that the buyer was eager to pay 
the full price of the out-of-pocket expenses?
Mr. Hyde. Our information was limited to what was in the application
and the additional information that the staff had submitted.
I had no contacts with the transferee at all. I never met them.
Mr. Keith. This is a unique arrangement where the original licensee
retains a minority interest in the five stations, reserving for himself
the right to influence the decisions of those stations as a minority
stockholder.
I would think it preferable that if there is to be a transaction, the
stations should be bought outright.
Mr. Hyde. This would undoubtedly be an easier case to handle.
Mr. Keith. I think that you should have said to the buyer: "Customarily
we require that the transfer be complete. Why if you are
willing to pay the cash don't you do just that and make it a clean
deal?"
Mr. Hyde. I would suppose that this would be, as you put it, a
cleaner way to handle it but there have been other instances where
permits were assigned and the previous owner retained a minority
interest.
Sometimes the original permittee has found it necessary to engage
the help of other people that have more money as the expense of the
operation became apparent.
There are several other cases where a minority interest was reserved
in connection with the sale.
Mr. Keith. Is a loan with an option proviso something you are
customarily confronted with?
Mr. Hyde. I can't recall any other instances where there was a loan
such as this.
Mr. Keith. The thing that disturbs me, Mr. Chairman, is that you
have approved a package of questionable items, not the least of which
is this loan and option.
Mr. Hyde. You will recall that this loan was secured by mortgages,
I believe second mortgages, but apparently fully secured by
security.
My suggestion is that this is the counterpart of the offeror who
makes the loan. The loan was not made solely as an inducement to
make the assignment. It was made on the basis of adequate security.

The Stock Purchase and Loan Agreements between Overmyer and AVC stated that the FCC must grant the transfer of all five construction permits without further conditions or modifications adverse to AVC—unless the changes are waived by AVC. In addition, a condition required before closing was that "AVC shall have made the loans to Overmyer Inc. or its subsidiaries called for under the Loan Agreement." The loan to Overmyer was—in fact—a condition of the sale.

The precedents referred to by Hyde were three transfers that included partially retained stock and an option potentially resulting in a profit to the optionor above out-of-pocket expenses: WKBF-TV, Channel 61, Cleveland, September 19, 1967; WOGO-TV, Channel 32, Chicago, January 19, 1965; and Overmyer's arrangement with Corwin for KEMO-TV, Channel 20, San Francisco, October 20, 1965. Using these precedents, Overmyer's retention of a minority interest in the stations meant he could conceivably receive—but only during the option period after several years of delay—a payment far higher than the 20 percent of the out-of-pocket expenses the FCC would allow if the retained stock were included in the initial sale. However, the loan provision was not present in any of the precedents: the loan gave Overmyer advance payment of the maximum ceiling value of his 20 percent share—rather than waiting for the possible exercise of the option over three years later—to assist in resolving the warehouse company's immediate financial difficulties.

The Broadcast Bureau's memorandum to the Commission, which recommended approval of the transfer of the construction permits, quoted from Overmyer's application: "[F]uture financing will be largely the obligation of [USCC]." In his dissenting statement, Commissioner Cox noted that "the increase in value [of Overmyer's stock] will be largely due to additional investment by AVC in the construction and operation of the stations." Answering a question from Keith, Cox maintained that this arrangement where Overmyer held an interest with no expectation of providing further financing should be forbidden by FCC policy:
Mr. Keith. Another area of concern to me is the fact that here you
have a buyer who wants to obtain the stations for cash. Fictitious or
not, the list price of out-of-pocket expenses, he had the money and he
was eager to do it and the Commission apparently did not inquire as
to why he would make that kind of deal instead of this one.
The easiest way to do it is selling it out and going into the trucking
business.
Mr. Cox. I am interested in the Commission considering a policy
that would announce that we will not permit this division of interest;
that if a man has decided he doesn't want to continue with his permit,
he should either sell it outright, or if he sells part of it and retains
an interest that he should be obliged to bear the burdens of the
business proportionately with the other parties. If he is willing to lend
money to the corporation, if he is willing to put money in to replace
losses, then that is fine.
I can see a case where a man started out in good faith and then did
need assistance. I don't think that is the case in these transactions
where the optionor [Overmyer] is free of any obligation to help
finance the further operation.

Commissioner Bartley had discussed this same point in his answer to a question from the Subcommittee earlier in the investigation regarding the FCC's three-year-rule (Rule 1.597):

In approving this transfer, the FCC allowed Overmyer to avoid the risk and expense of developing the permits and enabled him to acquire an interest in a far more substantial enterprise for much less money than was committed initially. He could then wait for U.S. Communications to develop the stations and enjoy the increased value with no further investment or effort on his part. The loan provision coupled with the option yielded an immediate realization of the possible future increased value of the stations that Overmyer desperately needed to rescue the warehouse company. The Broadcast Bureau said as much in its memorandum to the Commission recommending approval of the transfer. The Commission had approved an arrangement that enabled the possibility of bypassing the policy of not recovering more than actual out-of-pocket expenses. The Commission had no public interest obligation to compromise its rules, policies and procedures for the construction permits to be used to resolve Overmyer's other business difficulties. The FCC had also sanctioned the acquisition of a large group of stations—that was discouraged, if not forbidden by an interim policy—by U.S. Communications Corporation, which it most certainly could not obtain by the usual method of prevailing in a public interest test involving comparative hearings against competitors. The dissenting commissioners felt that in the desire to encourage rapid UHF development, the Broadcast Bureau and a majority of the Commission had compromised their mandate to protect the public interest.

Despite its justifications for approving the transfer, the FCC proposed new rules to tighten control over construction permit transfers. On August 28, 1968, the FCC issued a notice of proposed rulemaking addressing several concerns revealed during the congressional investigation of the Overmyer construction permit transfers to U.S. Communications. The statement invited public comments suggesting changes or additions before adopting the rules. The FCC suggested changing the out-of-pocket policy into a rule which would strengthen the prohibition of using permits to make a profit without providing service to the public. In addition, new rules would be created to control the retention of stock by sellers and any options that could provide a profit over legitimate out-of-pocket expenses. The FCC would subject these contract provisions to "the most searching scrutiny" and test the "true significance and character of the retained interest". The FCC included these provisions in new rules adopted the following year.

Congressional Hearings Report
On May 19, 1969, The Subcommittee Report, Trafficking in Broadcast Station Licenses and Construction Permits—Acquisition and Transfer of Five Overmyer Television Construction Permits, was published. It was a critical review of the FCC's grant of the construction permits to Overmyer and the subsequent transfer of those permits to the U.S. Communications Corporation.

The report criticized the FCC's issuance of the permits to Overmyer in 1965 without an adequate examination of the applications and not holding hearings to investigate their apparent deficiencies. The report expressed that the FCC had not fulfilled its statutory obligations: "Instead of basing its findings upon an evidentiary record, the Commission relied upon unsubstantiated representations and refused to subject them either to staff analysis or to the scrutiny of the hearing process."  The report stated, "Each of his applications submitted to the Commission failed to supply the appropriate financial information required." The Subcommittee's investigators indicated that the warehouse company's financial statements submitted by Overmyer to the FCC to prove the financial ability to construct and operate the stations were not audited by outside accountants, which created doubts regarding the available assets. Outside audits of the warehouse company and Overmyer's personal finances were required by lending institutions before considering loans for the television stations. However, after questioning the banks, the Subcommittee's investigators determined Overmyer had never submitted any of this information. As a result, the letters from banks used by Overmyer to indicate loan commitments were—in fact—not solid binding agreements to lend funds, as required by the FCC, but instead were only an offer to consider the loans if the audited statements were acceptable. Overmyer's personal balance sheet, which was required by the banks to guarantee the loans needed to construct and operate the stations, indicated assets over liabilities of only $963.

The Subcommittee noted the Broadcast Bureau had stated that Overmyer's applications for the initial grants did not provide sufficient evidence for the estimated first-year income from station advertising; this justification is required when including the advertising income in the financing plan for the construction and operation of the stations. The FCC established this new financial standard in the Ultravision Decision (FCC 65-581), released on July 2, 1965:

The Ultravision standard increased the period an applicant must show financial ability to operate the station without income from three months to one year. The origin of this revised standard was in a decision issued by FCC Commissioners Bartley, Lee and Cox. On March 12, 1965, they released Memorandum Report and order FCC 65M-282 stating that

The panel had initially proposed applying an enhanced standard of financial qualification only to applicants for UHF TV stations in markets with three (or more) commercial VHF TV stations. They also recommended that the applicant show estimated three-year revenue and establish the basis for that projection. In the Overmyer case, the Ultravision standard applied to the Pittsburgh, Houston and San Francisco applications because they were pending when the new standard was adopted. The Atlanta, Cincinnati and Toledo applications were under the original three-month rule since they had been awarded before Ultravision was instituted. Although the new standard was ultimately expanded to all broadcast station applications and the revenue projection period was reduced to one year, it was clear the Commission had long-term concerns regarding the success of UHF TV.

In the applications filed with the FCC by Overmyer, the estimated costs of station construction and operation exceeded the funds represented as reasonably available to meet the Ultravision standard. Despite Overmyer's lack of financial showing, the Bureau made estimates of station income to justify there was sufficient financing to award the permits: their report to the Commission stated, "Furthermore, it is not unreasonable to expect his six stations, all located in major markets, to generate total first-year revenue of $1,000,000." The Subcommittee noted the Broadcast Bureau's estimates of advertising income were made with no more evidence than Overmyer submitted in his applications: their report stated, "If broadcast station applicants must make a strong evidentiary showing to support their projections of advertising revenue, surely the Commission is under an obligation to do no less when it, too, engages in projection-making."

Despite FCC requirements, Overmyer did not provide statements of the net income after taxes for the previous two years for himself and the warehouse company. The Bureau ignored this omission and never requested the information before recommending the Commission approve the construction permits. The Subcommittee examined the tax returns filed by Overmyer's warehouse company with the Internal Revenue Service in 1964 and 1965, which showed operating losses of $29,000 and $94,000, respectively.

The report characterized the FCC's examination of Overmyer's initial applications:

The report stated, "A review of the facts pertaining to each of the CP [construction permit] applications led to one conclusion only: The Commission carelessly and in disregard of the law and its own requirements, committed serious errors in making permit grants to Overmyer in the first instance, and compounded that error by subsequently approving their transfers."

The Subcommittee described the loan and stock option arrangement with the U.S. Communications Corporation as a "sham," guaranteeing Overmyer a profit in violation of the FCC's out-of-pocket expense policy. Under the Communications Act of 1934, the FCC can consent to a construction permit transfer only after determining it is in the public interest. The Subcommittee insisted the FCC had abdicated this responsibility by not adequately investigating the profit potential of the transaction either inside or outside of a hearing. The investigators' analysis revealed that if the U.S. Communications Corporation picked up the option, using either option price method, the purchase price was designed to exceed $3 million, so the loan would not have to be repaid. The report stated, "The option price formula was an ill-disguised means of circumventing the Commission's out-of-pocket expenses policy—a paper attempt to legitimize for FCC consumption the unauthorized $3 million stock payment afforded earlier to Overmyer under the mask of a loan." The Subcommittee concluded the stock option and loan arrangement was a profit-taking device:

The report included a detailed examination of the out-of-pocket expenses claimed in the sale of permits to the U.S. Communications Corporation. The investigators found overcharges for services, services never rendered, and expenses listed that did not apply to the actual permits transferred. The Subcommittee stated that the FCC had "accepted without question the unverified material Overmyer submitted in support of these expenditures." The Subcommittee described the FCC's failure to examine behind the transfer applications:

The report commented on  the Broadcast Bureau's practice of accepting the certification of applications rather than performing a closer investigation:

The Subcommittee Report responded to the Commission's testimony that insufficient resources were available to examine the typical applications in-depth:

The Subcommittee noted that Overmyer had not filed the required amendments to applications for an extension of time to construct the TV stations:

The FCC's Top Fifty Interim Policy required a hearing if an application's approval would produce ownership of more broadcast properties than the proposed rule would permit. The hearing requirement would be waived if the applicant met the standard of a  "compelling affirmative showing" that the public interest would be served: to satisfy this standard, Overmyer maintained that each UHF station would be in a market facing substantial competition. The Broadcast Bureau stated, "[T]he position of the applicants is that given the array of competition which the permitees here will face once they go on the air (and which WPHL-TV now faces), transfer of the permits to individual buyers is impractical, and the resources of a financially strong owner are needed to meet competition." However, Overmyer's justification could be applied to every competitive situation a UHF station in a major market would encounter. The Bureau noted that the Commission had granted waivers in all previous cases, so they could in this case as well. The Bureau stated, "[T]he 'compelling affirmative showing' made here rises to the level of other showings which have been considered adequate to justify a grant without hearing. In view of this and other matters discussed earlier, the Bureau recommends the Top Fifty Interim Policy be waived."Essentially, the Bureau's waiver justification was that creating a group owner was required to ensure the stations were successful. The Subcommittee Report further commented on the previous waivers of the Top Fifty Interim Policy:

The Commission's order approving the transfer stated, "The Commission is of the view that a grant of this application would foster the development of UHF stations. This would be consistent with the Commission's efforts to provide a more competitive nationwide television service to the public. It is therefore believed the public interest would be served by a waiver of the Interim Policy." The FCC had previously stated that the success of UHF stations should not depend on group ownership. The Top Fifty Interim Policy was—in part—created to limit the concentration of ownership in the expanding UHF service. However, the acceptance by the majority of the commissioners of the Bureau's justification for the waiver based on the need for group ownership  went directly against the policy's stated objective. The inference was that—in this situation—the FCC's goal of rapidly expanding UHF service superseded  the Top Fifty Interim Policy.  The Subcommittee noted that the FCC abdicated its duty to protect the public interest by not subjecting this Top Fifty Interim Policy waiver request to a hearing. The report stated, "[T]he FCC proceeded to violate the letter and intent of its own rules, simply by disregarding them, and the Communications Act [of 1934] by failing to base its public interest determinations on findings of fact." The Subcommittee maintained that in using the All-Channel Receiver Act to justify the transfer, the FCC's "main concern here was to safeguard the UHF investments of broadcast entrepreneurs and  new sources of UHF capital are given regulatory accommodation even over the proper administration of the law."

The Subcommittee Report noted the absence of an essential public interest finding required by statute before the FCC can approve any construction permit transfer. Section 310 (b) of the Communications Act of 1934 requires a separate determination of the public interest for each construction permit transfer before FCC approval can be given. During testimony in the Subcommittee hearing of December 15, 1967, FCC Chairman Hyde insisted this finding had been made and was outlined in the Bureau's memorandum to the Commission recommending the transfer be approved. However, testimony was given on July 31, 1968, by the chief of the Broadcast Bureau, who approved the Bureau's memorandum, contradicting Hyde's assertion. Responding to questioning by the Subcommittee, Smith said no separate determination was made for each market:Mr. Lishman. Where in the staff memorandum approving this
transfer is there any determination that the public interest for each
of the five CP's [construction permits] would be served by the transfer?
Mr. George Smith. Paragraph 26 on page 12 contains the recommendation
that the above-captioned applications be granted and the
Commission of course is aware that it can only grant if it makes a
finding that it is in the public interest. We try to save a little work
where we can and that is the law.
Mr. Lishman. Is it a fact that there is no determination with respect
to any individual location here as to whether the public interest would
be served or not?
Mr. George Smith. That is inherent in the memorandum.
Mr. Lishman. I don't understand that. Aren't conditions different
in each market?
Mr. George Smith. We recommended that the Commission grant these
transfers for all five.
Mr. Lishman. Did you make a study of the market conditions in
Cincinnati?
Mr. George Smith. No, sir.
Mr. Lishman. Was any submitted to you by the applicant?
Mr. George Smith. I don't believe so.

The Bureau considered the transfer of these permits as a group rather than making a public interest determination for each particular station as required by the Communications Act of 1934. Overmyer did not provide this information, and the FCC never sought it inside or outside a hearing. Given these considerations regarding the public interest requirements of the Communications Act of 1934 and the Top Fifty Interim Policy, Commissioner Cox, in his dissenting opinion, stated the actual test before approving these transfers: "I do not think the majority [of the commissioners] can make a finding, on the basis of what is now before us, that there is such an unusual and urgent need for additional television service in these five communities that we must disregard important policies in other areas in order to rush these stations to completion. UHF is important, but not all important."

The lack of hearings by the FCC was of particular concern :

The Subcommittee recommended that "[t]he FCC should set aside its order of December 8, 1967, consenting to the transfer of Overmyer's five CP's [construction permits] to U.S. Co., and hold public hearings in the community where each station is located to determine whether Overmyer should be authorized to continue as a permittee of the five stations." Also suggested were new legislation and changes in FCC rules that would prevent profit from construction permit transfers.

Although Congress did not pass any legislation changing the Communications Act of 1934, in March 1969, the FCC changed many policies and rules to prevent the methods exposed during the investigation that afforded a profit to Overmyer. When selling a construction permit, a hearing is required if there is a possibility of actual or potential financial gain above the provable out-of-pocket expenses. In particular, scrutiny will be given to cases where a seller keeps an interest in the construction permit, which may be disposed of later at a profit. Sellers are not barred from retaining some stock in the construction permit; however, a hearing can only be waived if they contribute capital to the further construction and operation of the station proportionate to their retained interest. Hearings would be required, with no waiver allowed, for cases involving a construction permit sale where the seller keeps some portion of the stock combined with an option for the transferee to purchase any part of the interest retained by the seller. A hearing is also required if the transfer agreement includes an option for the seller of a partial interest to purchase additional stock in the station later from the transferee. FCC Rule 1.597 (e) and (f) were enacted to carry out these provisions. Section (f) (4) addressed the hearing requirement for options:

This rule would have forced a mandatory hearing of the Overmyer transfer case because of the option in the contract for U.S. Communications to purchase later Overmyer's 20 percent interest. The rule calls for a mandatory hearing only if an option exists in the contract involving the sale of a partial interest in the permit. Interestingly, the new rule would not prevent a seller who retains a minority interest from selling it later in a separate transaction at a profit. The FCC does not require permission to sell a minority interest, which does not involve a transfer of control of the station—the only requirement is to file the sale details with the FCC. In addition, the existing policy that prevents the recovery of more than the out-of-pocket expenses in the sale of construction permits was codified as a rule. Also, a new requirement was added for transfer applicants to file an itemized out-of-pocket expense list and further defined the specific expenses the FCC would approve. The transfer applicants must also declare no other agreements exist outside those disclosed in the application.

Federal Communications Commission Hearing
The Federal Communications Commission held a hearing investigating Overmyer lasting from 1970 until 1980. On August 26, 1970, the Commission announced a hearing to investigate the transfers of construction permits from Overmyer to U.S. Communications Corporation. FCC Memorandum Opinion and Order (FCC 70-911) set the purpose of the hearing on two issues:

The FCC did not set aside the permit transfers as recommended by the Subcommittee in their report. The control of the permits by U.S. Communications was allowed to stand while the FCC hearing was aimed solely at Overmyer. The hearing was narrowly focused only on the representations made by Overmyer to the FCC regarding the out-of-pocket expenses. The numerous other issues raised by the Subcommittee in the congressional investigation would not be addressed in the FCC hearing.

Memorandum Opinion and Order (FCC 70-911) referred expressly to the nature of the possible misrepresentation to be investigated:

The Commission's hearing order did not explicitly express interest in Overmyer's intent regarding any possible misrepresentation in the expense submissions. This omission opened two possible interpretations of the issue: if intentional, the misrepresentation would be fraudulent, and if not deliberate, it would be "to serve badly or improperly as a representation of," which is not a fraud. If Overmyer intentionally misrepresented the out-of-pocket expenses, the FCC could find him not to have the character qualifications to remain a licensee of the Commission. Consequently, despite WDHO-TV having no involvement in the construction permit transfers and never being mentioned in the Memorandum Report and Order (FCC 70-911), the FCC could revoke its license in a separate proceeding. In August 1970, the FCC deferred WDHO-TV's license renewal, which was due to be acted upon on October 1, 1970, pending the results of the hearing. WDHO-TV's initial license was issued on October 2, 1967, and the FCC considered TV stations' licenses for renewal every three years.

On September 28, 1970, Overmyer filed a petition with the FCC Review Board for deletion of an issue and change of assignment in the burden of proof from himself to the FCC. Overmyer cited FCC rules that give the Commission thirty days to order rehearings of decisions. He argued that because the Commission had never filed for a rehearing, the decision was final, and the FCC had no jurisdiction to alter the agreement. In addition, the Commission never stated any specific statutory authority when it designated the hearing. Overmyer said that Issue No. 2 should therefore be deleted from the hearing. Overmyer conceded that the Commission had the authority to proceed with the misrepresentation issue. Still, since the proceeding contemplated restructuring a final action, "Congress intended that the ultimate burden of proof be placed upon the Commission." On February 8, 1971, the Review Board issued Memorandum Opinion and Order (FCC 71R-43), stating it had no jurisdiction to fundamentally change the nature of the designation Memorandum Opinion and Order (FCC 70-911). Accordingly, they denied both of Overmyer's requests and sent the burden of proof question to the Commission for determination.

On September 29, 1970, Overmyer filed a second petition for reconsideration of Memorandum Opinion and Order (FCC 70–911)—this time with the full Commission. He made the same two arguments present in the petition to the Review Board. First, he maintained the Commission had no jurisdiction since the action contemplates the restructuring of a transfer agreement approved two and one-half years prior. The Commission had never filed for a rehearing of that decision within the thirty days set in the FCC Rules; therefore, Overmyer argued, the FCC cannot disturb the agreement at this late date. Second, the Commission had never stated its legal authority for the contemplated actions in Issue No. 2; Overmyer maintained this omission illustrated that they were unsure of their jurisdiction.

On March 3, 1971, the Commission adopted Memorandum Opinion and Order (FCC 71-213), denying Overmyer's petition to delete Issue No. 2 and stating, "Based upon all the information before us when we designated this proceeding for evidentiary hearing, we concluded that we had the affirmative duty to re-examine the Overmyer transfer of control agreement to be sure that the Commission's prior approval was not obtained by fraudulent misrepresentation. Both Court and Commission case precedents have recognized an inherent power to reopen a judgment any time where it is procured by fraud."

On August 18, 1971, the Commission adopted Memorandum Opinion and Order (FCC 71-842), placing the burden of proof for fraud on the Bureau due to "the seriousness of charges which Overmyer is required to answer". Overmyer's burden of proof was to make a prima facie showing substantially supporting his out-of-pocket expenses. Still, the  Bureau would have to prove any misrepresentation found was intentional. There were three possible outcomes in the proceeding: (1) Overmyer did not misrepresent the expenses, (2) Overmyer intentionally misrepresented the expenses, and (3) Overmyer misrepresented the expenses but not intentionally.

In the Initial Decision, Administrative Law Judge Herbert Sharfman outlined his interpretation of the designation Memorandum Opinion and Order (FCC 70-911):

Judge Sharfman commented on the Commission later inserting fraud into the proceeding:

While acknowledging the Commission's use of the term "fraudulent misrepresentation" in the Memorandum Opinion and Order (FCC 71-213) and despite its deferral of WDHO-TV's license renewal, the Administrative Law Judge would decide the case while excluding the possibility of intent in interpreting the term "misrepresentation" present in FCC Memorandum Opinion and Order (FCC 70-911). So "misrepresentation" would be determined only on Overmyer's ability to support his original submission of out-of-pocket expenses to the FCC. By removing the consideration of Overmyer's intent from the proceeding, the conclusions of the Initial Decision would not satisfy the desired scope of the Commission's inquiry to determine if fraud occurred as expanded by Memorandum Opinion and Orders (FCC 71-213) and (FCC 71-842).

Testimony was given during hearing sessions held on January 24, February 7 and June 7, 8 and 9, 1972. In the Initial Decision, the Administrative Law Judge indicated that Overmyer's attempt to meet the burden of proof in the hearing used the same justification for the out-of-pocket expenses made in the construction permit transfer application; no new evidence was introduced expanding the representations made in the application to the FCC or the subsequent congressional investigation. During the hearing, it was revealed that—unlike earlier representations—usable financial records did exist for times before the base period of September–December 1966. This information contradicted Byrnes's sworn statement in the certified construction permit transfer application filed with the FCC on June 30, 1967, and his testimony given under oath in the 1968 congressional hearings. The unavailability of usable records outside of the base period had been Byrnes's justification for the elaborate out-of-pocket expense formula he designed for use in the application to the FCC. In the transfer documents filed by Overmyer with the FCC, Byrnes stated, "The cost of the 'staff' services was never separated out when they were recorded by the Warehouse and other Companies prior to September 1966. Such costs, especially the non-personnel costs of the various functions, were buried within the total expenses of the Company involved." Byrnes admitted that he was aware the records before the base period were recorded in the same manner as those within the base period but initially claimed they were "inflated," later changing to "having no faith in their accuracy". The expense records of The Overmyer Company from January through March 1967 were not prepared when the out-of-pocket expense determination was made, which required including that period in the approximation formula. He acknowledged the documents had not been examined to determine their accuracy relative to the approximation formula. Although an outside audit of the records was available, no evidence was presented in the hearing to support Byrnes's claim the records were inaccurate. Overmyer maintained the Broadcast Bureau's use of the financial records outside of the base period was inconsequential because any costs taken from them would be no more accurate than those from the approximation formula. Byrnes felt that before September 1966, when The Overmyer Company began operation, the accounting was in a state where "anything was possible".

The Commission was careful in its Memorandum Opinion and Order (FCC 71–842) to define the burden Overmyer was to carry in the hearing:

In reaching his findings and conclusions the Administrative Law Judge stated that

This statement indicates the judge found Overmyer's presentation failed to carry the burden of proof required in the Memorandum Opinion and Order (FCC 71-842). The Bureau noted that Overmyer failed in his burden of proof without any rebuttal on their part:

The Bureau insisted that Byrnes's mischaracterization of the usability of the records outside of the base period indicated evidence of fraud in the construction permit transfer application. Examining the newly revealed financial documents, the Bureau claimed the approximation formula had overstated Overmyer's out-of-pocket expenses by $227,000.00.

On April 30, 1973, the Administrative Law Judge issued Initial Decision (FCC 73D-23): "It is therefore held that in the applications for transfer of control Overmyer misrepresented to the Commission the amount of out-of-pocket expenses incurred in obtaining and developing the construction permits." However, he explained the term misrepresentation: "'Misrepresentation,' as has been emphasized, does not connote culpably false statements or intent to mislead the Commission." The judge said, "It should, however, be understood that no certificate of innocence is intended; whether Overmyer acted from blackest motives or was merely mistaken is immaterial." Concluding Issue No. 1, Judge Sharfman stated, "[I]t cannot be found that there is a reasonable concordance between the represented and 'actual' expenses. This is 'misrepresentation.'" The ruling on Issue No. 2 pointed out possible limitations in the FCC's jurisdiction over contracts:

The Administrative Law Judge wrote a straightforward ruling on Issue No. 2: "Cast about as one will, one cannot grant affirmative relief under Issue No. 2."

At this point in the FCC hearing, the option for U.S. Communications to purchase Overmyer's 20 percent stock in the TV stations had expired. Except for WXIX-TV in Cincinnati and WPHL-TV in Philadelphia, all operational U.S. Communications Corporation stations had gone off the air due to low advertising revenue. In 1972, WXIX-TV was sold to Metromedia Incorporated for the assumption of the station's $3 million debt. The stations that ceased operation were sold, or sales were pending—in all cases for a nominal payment. KJDO-TV had never been constructed, and its construction permit was deleted. In effect, the value of Overmyer's equity in the U.S. Communications' stations was minimal. Essentially, Issue No. 2 of the FCC Memorandum Opinion and Order (FCC 70-911) had been resolved without intervention by the FCC.

However, WDHO-TV remained operational and wholly-owned by Overmyer.

Overmyer recognized that omitting the question of intent in the finding of misrepresentation in the Initial Decision (FCC 73D-23) did not resolve the issue of fraud introduced by the Commission in its Memorandum Opinion and Order (FCC 71-213), which could affect his character qualifications to remain the licensee of WDHO-TV. On October 11, 1973, Overmyer filed a Petition for Special Relief requesting the proceeding be terminated or remanded to the Administrative Law Judge to resolve the fraud issue. On December 28, 1973, the FCC's Review Board released Memorandum Opinion and Order (FCC 73R-420), remanding the case to decide if Mr. Overmyer personally committed any fraudulent conduct. The Review Board stated that

The remand Memorandum Opinion and Order (FCC 73R-420) did not direct the Administrative Law Judge to reconsider his ruling on Issue No. 2. The actions considered under that issue in Memorandum Opinion and Order (FCC 70-911) were no longer an effective method of relief. The hearing would continue solely to examine for fraud. If the misrepresentation were intentional, then a separate proceeding would be necessary to determine Overmyer's qualifications to remain a licensee of WDHO-TV.

The Administrative Law Judge responded to the remand Memorandum Opinion and Order (FCC 73R-420) from the Review Board by observing

Judge Sharfman noted that "reviewing authorities cannot ascribe to him an initial decision different from the one he really wrote and issued." In addition, the judge stated, "[I]t has already been indicated that there was a substantial discrepancy, at least in this writer's opinion, between the holding of the Initial Decision [FCC 73D-23] and the Review Board's description of it." The Review Board had misinterpreted the judge's ruling in the Initial Decision on Issue No. 2. They thought the judge had disposed of the issue because the U.S. Communications Corporation did not exercise the option to buy Overmyer's 20 percent stock, and the greatly diminished value of those remaining holdings. The Review Board stated, "The Administrative Law Judge further held that since the value of Overmyer's retained interest was marginal, requiring him to transfer this interest to AVC would be a meaningless gesture." Judge Sharfman responded, "The Board's construction has the virtue of simplicity, but does not accurately represent the initial decision." The judge corrected this erroneous interpretation by stating his actual ruling was that "the cause [of Issue No. 2] was misbegotten"—in other words, ill-conceived by the Commission. He further said that his ruling on Issue No. 2 was not related to the present status of the five transferred permits, which he was aware of and had outlined in the Initial Decision. The Review Board had mistakenly attributed a quote of Overmyer in the Initial Decision—as being the judge's opinion—indicating that due to the expiration of the option and the low value of the remaining stations in which Overmyer still had an interest, Issue No. 2 had been resolved without the forced transfer of the 20 percent stock to U.S. Communications contemplated in the Memorandum Opinion and Order (FCC 70-911). This correction by the judge led back to his opinion in the Initial Decision that the FCC did not have the authority to act under the suggested relief methods stated under Issue No. 2.

No new testimony was given in the remand proceeding; the decision was based on the existing record of the hearing and additional written submissions from Overmyer and the Bureau. The Administrative Law Judge stated, "[F]or the Bureau to succeed it must paint D. H. Overmyer into a corner. 'Fraudulent misrepresentation' is an accusation against Mr. Overmyer. From the record it must be determined if he is legally chargeable with this personal dereliction." He also defined the burden of proof placed on the Bureau: "[O]ne must still be mindful of the affirmative duty of the accuser to bring home to him [Overmyer] his responsibility and guilt by 'clear, precise, and indubitable' evidence." The legal standard of "clear, precise and indubitable evidence" was a higher level than the "preponderance of the evidence" used in most civil trials.  This higher evidentiary standard is the same as "clear and convincing" and "clear, cogent and convincing". This stronger degree of proof was used in civil cases where fraud was an issue. In addition, the judge stated, "[T]o hold Mr. Overmyer at fault there must be more than a determination that officers or employees of the Overmyer companies misbehaved within the scope of their general authority. The conduct must be brought home to Mr. Overmyer by more than a recitation of wrongful acts and a conclusion of their prejudicial consequences. . . . There is nothing in the record from which it could be found that Mr. Overmyer participated personally in the studies which underlay the figures submitted to the Commission." In addition, the mischaracterization of the financial records by Byrnes revealed in the FCC hearing was never connected to Overmyer personally. Judge Sharfman observed that "[t]he rapidity with which Mr. Byrnes shifted his ground for reluctance to rely on the book entries (from 'inflation' to an unsupported claim of 'inaccuracy') makes it appear reasonable, to the extent that any appraisal of a past state of mind is valid, to conclude that the representation that the books were not usable was a deliberate and conscious misrepresentation." The judge concluded: "[T]he need for using a formula because of the inadequacy, on whatever ground, of the book entries, was not established."

On May 13, 1974, the Administrative Law Judge issued a Supplemental Initial Decision (FCC 74D-29) stating, "It must therefore be concluded, in the terms of the remand, that Mr. D. H. Overmyer did not 'intentionally or fraudulently misle[a]d the Commission.'" In addition, there was "a complete failure of the record to inculpate Mr. Overmyer personally, directly or by implication". During the remand proceeding, the Administrative Law Judge noted that "[t]o resolve any doubt on the score, Overmyer has stated that he stands ready to transfer to AVC or its designee whatever remaining interests he may still have in any of the permits without any additional consideration."

The Bureau and Overmyer filed exceptions in an appeal for the FCC Review Board to review the Supplemental Initial Decision (FCC 74D-29). The Bureau argued that the Administrative Law Judge used a higher standard of proof than was appropriate to decide the misrepresentation issue. Their view was a "preponderance of the evidence" was more consistent with past cases of misrepresentation decided by the FCC. In addition, the Bureau maintained the judge did not make any findings of fact but merely set out the parties' contentions. Overmyer's exceptions regarded the judge's conclusions on the lack of justification for the out-of-pocket expense approximation method and the misrepresentation by Byrnes on the relevance of expense records before the base period of September through December 1966.

On August 21, 1975, the Review Board released Decision (FCC 75R-313). The ruling stated that the Administrative Law Judge made an error regarding the standard of proof used in the remand decision. It was noted that "[a] finding of fraudulent misrepresentation may be founded upon a less stringent standard, namely, the preponderance of the evidence." In addition, the Review Board commented on the effect of employee misdeeds on the licensee: "It is well established that the gross misconduct and fraud of an employee will be imputed to the licensee." They further noted that "[t]he record evidence does not support the conclusion that Overmyer's failure to substantiate its expenses was the proximate result of Byrnes' misrepresentations." The Review Board stated, "[W]e cannot determine on the basis of the record that the Bureau's estimate of communications expenses is any more accurate than Overmyer's estimate of the expenses. Moreover, we believe that the Bureau's showing . . . regarding specific erroneous departmental allocations falls short of establishing fraudulent misrepresentation." The Decision (FCC 75R-313) expressed the Review Board's "opinion that the Bureau failed to sustain its burden of proof, i.e., that it failed to establish by a preponderance of the evidence that Overmyer fraudulently misrepresented its claimed out-of-pocket expenses for the permits to the Commission." The Review Board found that although the Administrative Law Judge used a higher burden of proof to determine fraud than was appropriate in the Supplemental Initial Decision, the Bureau had nevertheless failed to prove its case under the correct lesser standard of "preponderance of the evidence".

The Review Board commented on the possibility of resolving Issue No. 2 of the designation Memorandum Opinion and Order (FCC 70-911):

Despite Judge Sharfman's opinion in the Initial Decision questioning the FCC's jurisdiction under Issue No. 2, this statement by the Review Board indicated that the present finding of misrepresentation—without fraud—was sufficient to require altering Overmyer's option terms with U.S. Communications. However, in the opinion of the Review Board, the option's expiration and the minimal value of Overmyer's 20 percent stock made action under Issue No. 2 unnecessary.

In this review of the Overmyer construction permit transfer case, the Review Board issued a final ruling on both issues specified in the original designation Memorandum Opinion and Order (FCC 70-911):

If allowed to stand, the practical effect of the Review Board's ruling was to remove the threat to Overmyer's character qualifications to remain a licensee of the Commission and allow WDHO-TV's license to be considered for renewal.

The proceedings of the FCC hearing, through the Review Board's remand Memorandum Opinion and Order (FCC 73R-420), confirmed the definition of misrepresentation in the designation Memorandum Opinion and Order (70-911) to include possible fraudulent misrepresentation—which must involve specific intent by Mr. Overmyer personally and the burden of proof of that fraud was on the Bureau. The Review Board, in its Decision (FCC 75R-313), then agreed with the Supplemental Initial Decision (FCC 74D-29), ruled that under Issue No. 1 of the designation Memorandum Opinion and Order (FCC 70-911) and subsequently clarified and altered in Memorandum Opinion and Orders (FCC 71-213 and FCC 71-842), neither Overmyer nor the Broadcast Bureau met their respective burdens of proof. Overmyer failed to support the out-of-pocket expenses, and the Bureau failed to prove the misrepresentation was intentional and, therefore, fraudulent.  While the Initial Decision, Memorandum Opinion and Order (FCC 73D-23), found that Overmyer misrepresented the expenses, the final Review Board Memorandum Opinion and Order (FCC 75R-313) confirmed the Supplemental Initial Decision Memorandum Opinion and Order (FCC 74D-29), which ruled the misrepresentation found under Issue No. 1 was not fraudulent.

The Bureau applied for a review by the Commission of the Review Board's Decision (FCC 75R-313). On July 1, 1980, almost five years after the Review Board's Memorandum Opinion and Order (FCC 75R-313) was released, the Commission adopted Memorandum Report and Order (FCC 80-391), denying the request by the Bureau for further review of the Overmyer case. The Commission noted that WDHO-TV, while still operational, was now in bankruptcy. Consequently, there was no point in continuing the delay of its license renewal to determine Overmyer's character qualifications; Overmyer would no longer be a licensee after transferring the station to a new owner. Also, the option held by U.S. Communications to purchase Overmyer's stock had passed unexercised. Additionally, WXIX-TV in Cincinnati had been sold for the assumption of debt, while KJDO-TV in Houston was never constructed; WATL-TV in Atlanta, KEMO-TV in San Francisco and WPGH-TV in Pittsburgh had been sold for minimal payments. The Commission indicated if a review were held that reversed the Review Board's Decision (FCC 75R-313), there was no relief possible under Issue No. 2: the contemplated relief methods in the FCC Memorandum Opinion and Order (FCC 70-911) were moot. The Commission noted that

After ten years in deferred status, the FCC renewed WDHO-TV's license on October 6, 1980.

Overmyer Network
On July 12, 1966, Overmyer announced plans to create a fourth television network to compete against the Big Three television networks. He named it the Overmyer Network (ON) and hired former ABC president Oliver Treyz. Overmyer also received exclusive rights to the Continental Football League. He also had plans to begin a daily late-night talk show from Las Vegas. By December 1966, the Overmyer Network had signed TV stations in 123 markets, including 24 of the largest 25.
However, in early 1967 because of the warehouse company's financial difficulties, Overmyer had insufficient funds to continue developing the network. So Overmyer officials went to the board of directors of the Mutual Broadcasting System to discuss a merger of the two networks, requesting some $500,000 to begin production of the late-night show and additional funds to keep the network operational until advertising revenue became available.

The Mutual board of directors turned down the merger proposal. But three Mutual stockholders; Texas oil operator Jack McGlothlin; grain dealer, an oil investor and land developer Willard Garvey; and James Nichols, a Texas advertising and public-relations executive; thought enough of the idea to form a separate group with eleven wealthy western businessmen to buy 80 percent stock in the Overmyer Network in March 1967 and rename it the United Network. Overmyer retained 20 percent of the stock but had no seat on the board of directors and no management role in the United Network.

The United Network and The Las Vegas Show hosted by Bill Dana premiered on May 1, 1967. In early May, Overmyer sold his 20 percent interest in the network to majority stockholders for $240,000 cash and a promissory note for $115,000. On June 1, 1967, due to insufficient advertising revenue and costly AT&T distribution charges, the United Network folded.  The last broadcast feed from the network of The Las Vegas Show was May 31.

A lawsuit was filed by LewRon Television, the television production services company, against D. H. Overmyer Leasing Company regarding payment on services provided to telecast The Las Vegas Show.

Bankruptcy
Due to poor advertising revenue, WATL-TV in Atlanta and KEMO-TV in San Francisco left the air on March 31, 1971, with WPGH-TV in Pittsburgh following on August 16, 1971. All three TV stations were sold and returned to the air with the same call letters: WATL-TV on July 5, 1976; KEMO-TV on February 4, 1972; and WPGH-TV on January 14, 1974. After nearly being taken off the air on August 6, 1971, WXIX-TV in Cincinnati was sold in 1972, for the assumption of the station's $3 million debt, to group owner Metromedia Incorporated. WPGH-TV was the only station of the U.S. Communications Corporation's group to enter receivership or bankruptcy. These sales ended Overmyer's interest in the U.S. Communications Corporation's subsidiaries; however,  WDHO-TV remained on the air as Toledo's ABC network affiliate (affiliated in 1969). The Toledo station was then the only operational TV station owned by Overmyer. The D. H. Overmyer Telecasting Company (Telecasting), founded in 1966, was the holding company for WDHO-TV. Overmyer pledged the stock of Telecasting to the First National Bank of Boston (FNBB) as security for a $6 million loan in 1971.

In 1973, Overmyer's warehouses began shutting down production and entered Chapter 11 in New York. Alleged improper conduct by Federal Bankruptcy Judge Roy Babitt and the court officers he appointed to the Overmyer bankruptcy proceedings were investigated in 1978. Overmyer's attorneys requested Babitt to remove himself from the case, which he refused to do. A grand jury was eventually called to investigate these allegations. In May 1978, Federal Judge Lloyd F. MacMahon ordered the removal of Babitt from the case.  On April 7, 1978, the order declaring the Overmyer Co. bankrupt was vacated, although a receiver was appointed. Murray Guy, a court appointee, pleaded guilty to fraud and cooperated with investigators against other persons involved in the kickbacks during the Overmyer Co. bankruptcy proceedings. A five-member Bankruptcy Committee, made up of judges from the United States District Court for the Southern District of New York, criticized Babitt for using "poor judgment" in appointing his brother's accounting firm to aid the receiver in the Overmyer bankruptcy. The Bankruptcy Committee further stated, "While Referee Babitt acted in good faith, he should have been aware that the appearance of influence was ever present, and the situation should have been avoided." The U.S. Bankruptcy Court of the Southern District of New York subsequently ordered the sale of the assets of D. H. Overmyer Co. Inc.

In 1976, after defaulting on the FNBB loan, Telecasting filed a petition under Chapter 11 bankruptcy in New York. This proceeding was dismissed in 1980 and appealed by Overmyer. The court denied the appeal, and on the same day, Telecasting filed under Chapter 11 in Cleveland. In the interim, Overmyer operated WDHO-TV in a debtor-in-possession arrangement with the court. On March 25, 1981, the Cleveland bankruptcy court awarded control of Telecasting to FNBB. Overmyer filed objections with the FCC claiming the court-ordered transfer violated the FCC rules regarding the transfer of control of broadcast station licenses. On May 12, 1983, the FCC rejected the petition and issued an order transferring control of WDHO-TV from Telecasting to FNBB. FNBB eventually sold WDHO-TV through bankruptcy to a local group, Toledo Television Investors, Ltd., for $19.6 million in 1986. The call letters of WDHO-TV were changed to WNWO-TV.

On August 7, 1981, the Overmyer leasing company (Hadar), which was in Chapter 11 bankruptcy, filed a proof of claim for $859,481.80 in the Telecasting bankruptcy proceedings. This filing would lead to the indictment of Overmyer and attorney Edmund M. Connery. Hadar purchased broadcasting equipment that it leased to Telecasting for use by WDHO-TV. The Government charged that aspects of the leases were falsified to the bankruptcy court to inflate the Hadar claim and unjustly enrich Overmyer.

On January 28, 1986, Overmyer and Connery were indicted in the United States District Court for the Northern District of Ohio. The indictment charged Overmyer and Connery with six counts of bankruptcy fraud, two counts of conspiracy to commit bankruptcy fraud, and one count of mail fraud. Connery, charged with six counts, was granted a separate trial.
Overmyer was convicted by a federal jury in Akron, Ohio, of one count of filing a false bankruptcy claim, and Connery was convicted of one count of aiding and abetting the filing of a false bankruptcy claim. The trial judge overturned the convictions, finding insufficient evidence to find the defendants guilty. The prosecution appealed the judge's decision to the United States Court of Appeals for the Sixth Circuit in Cincinnati, which reinstated the convictions. In 1989, Overmyer was sentenced to three years in federal prison (with six months in custody), three years probation, and a $5000 fine. On May 10, 1990, the United States Court of Appeals for the Sixth Circuit denied an appeal from Overmyer and left standing the conviction. Overmyer appealed to the Supreme Court and was denied a hearing on October 29, 1990. Connery was sentenced to two years on probation and a $5000 fine. Connery was also disbarred from practicing law in New York State.  On May 15, 1991, Overmyer was released from the Federal Correctional Institute (FCI) Englewood in Littleton, Colorado.

Personal life

Marriage and children
Overmyer married his wife Shirley in 1943. They had four children. His daughter Olga was an adopted child from  his second marriage. Overmyer's wife Shirley preceded him death in 1994.

Illness and death
In the mid-1980s, Overmyer and Shirley relocated to Denver. In 2009, Overmyer suffered a debilitating stroke. Shortly after, he moved to an assisted living facility in Tarzana, California to be closer to his son John. Overmyer died on July 24, 2012, at the Providence Tarzana Medical Center in Tarzana. He was 87 years old. His funeral was held on Sunday July 29 at the Reeb Funeral Home in Sylvania, Ohio. He was buried in Toledo Memorial Park in Sylvania, Ohio.

References

External links
 Written opinions of FCC commissioners on sale of construction permits to AVC 
 Daniel H. Overmyer Profile: Broadcasting May 30, 1966 Page 93 
 Overmyer-A Man And His Network uhfhistory.com K.M. Richards
 FCC History Cards for WDHO-TV, WATL-TV, WXIX-TV, KEMO-TV and WPGH-TV 
 House Investigation Subcommittee Records from 1968 Hearing 
 Trafficking in Broadcast Station Licenses and Construction Permits; Hearings Before the Special Subcommittee on Investigations of the Committee on Interstate and Foreign Commerce House of Representatives; Serial No. 90-50 90th Congress; December 15, 1967; July 16, 17, 19, 31 and August 1, 1968 
 91st Congress 1st session Report 91-256 United States Congressional Serial Set no. 12839-2, Vol. 3-2, May 19, 1969 Trafficking in broadcast station licenses and construction permits
 FCC Report 73D-23 Issued April 30, 1973
 FCC Report 74D-29  Issued May 13, 1974
 FCC Review Board Report 75R-313 Issued August 5, 1975
 FCC Memorandum Opinion and Order 80-391  Adopted July 1, 1980
 Photograph of D.H. Overmyer taken 7-15-1966 (JPEG Format 948 KB) 
 Photograph of D.H. Overmyer taken 7-29-1983 (JPEG Format 880 KB) 

1924 births
2012 deaths
American television executives
American mass media owners
20th-century American businesspeople
Denison University alumni
Businesspeople from Toledo, Ohio
Military personnel from Ohio
People from Ottawa Hills, Ohio
United States Army personnel of World War II